= Tokyo National Museum =

Art museum in Tokyo, Japan

- 東京国立博物館

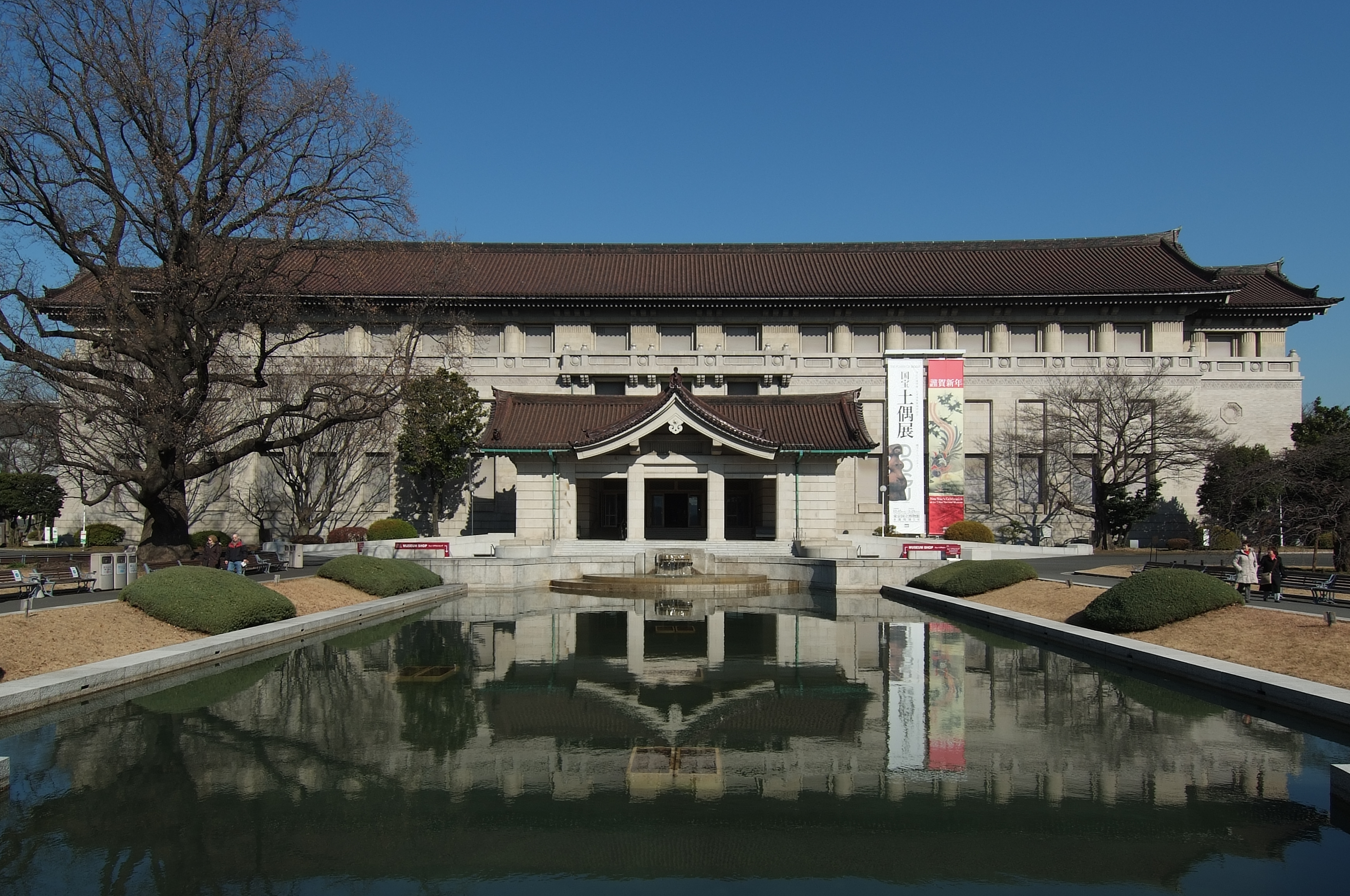
- The Honkan (Main Gallery)
- Interactive fullscreen map
- Established: 1872; 154 years ago
- Location: Ueno, Taitō, Tokyo, Japan
- Coordinates: 35°43′08″N 139°46′35″E
- Type: Art museum
- Collection size: 110,000
- Visitors: 2,180,000 (2017)
- Public transit access: Ueno Station; Uguisudani Station; Keisei Ueno Station; Nezu Station
- Website: tnm.jp

The Tokyo National Museum (東京国立博物館, Tōkyō Kokuritsu Hakubutsukan) or TNM is an art museum in Ueno Park in the Taitō ward of Tokyo, Japan. It is considered the oldest national museum and the largest art museum in Japan. The museum collects, preserves, and displays a comprehensive collection of artwork and cultural objects from Asia, with a focus on ancient and medieval Japanese art and Asian art along the Silk Road. There is also a large collection of Greco-Buddhist art. As of April 2023, the museum held approximately 120,000 Cultural Properties, including 89 National Treasures, 319 Horyuji Treasures, and 649 Important Cultural Properties. As of the same date, the Japanese government had designated 902 works of art and crafts as National Treasures and 10,820 works of art and crafts as Important Cultural Properties, (Note: Counting like 110,000 or 89 is not the number of objects. For example, 1 set of 12 Buddha statues is counted as 1.) so the museum holds about 10% of the works of art and crafts designated as National Treasures and 6% of those designated as Important Cultural Properties. The museum also holds 2,651 cultural properties deposited by individuals and organisations, of which 54 are National Treasures and 262 are Important Cultural Properties. Of these, 3,000 cultural properties are on display at one time, with each changing for between four and eight weeks. The museum also conducts research and organizes educational events related to its collection.

The facilities consist of the Honkan, holding the Japanese Gallery; the Heiseikan and Hyokeikan, holding special exhibitions; the Toyokan, holding the Asian Gallery; the Gallery of Horyuji Treasures, holding important relics originally preserved at Nara's Horyu Temple; the Kuroda Memorial Hall, holding a collection of works by Kuroda Seiki; and the Research and Information Center. There are restaurants and shops within the museum's premises, as well as outdoor exhibitions (including the Kuromon) and a garden where visitors can enjoy seasonal views.

The Tokyo National Museum is one of four museums operated by the National Institutes for Cultural Heritage; the other three are Kyoto National Museum, Nara National Museum, and Kyushu National Museum. The Tokyo National Museum is a representative museum that comprehensively exhibits Japanese cultural assets, but other national museums are more complete in specific areas, such as cultural assets from the Meiji era in the 1800s to the present. The Independent Administrative Institution National Museum of Art, operates seven museums (Note: National Museum of Modern Art, Tokyo; National Crafts Museum (Japan); National Museum of Modern Art, Kyoto; National Museum of Western Art; National Museum of Art, Osaka; The National Art Center, Tokyo; National Film Archive of Japan) specializing in specific fields, including those focusing on modern art and Japanese crafts and those focusing on Western art. Two museums (Note: National Museum of Japanese History; National Museum of Ethnology (Japan)) managed by the National Institutes for the Humanities focus on folklore. The Museum of the Imperial Collections, managed by the Imperial Household Agency, focuses on cultural assets donated to the nation by Japanese imperial family.

== Names ==
The museum went through several name changes. The original 1872 exhibition was known as the "Museum of the Ministry of Education". The compound in Uchiyamashita-chō was initially known simply as "the Museum" (Hakubutsukan) before becoming the "Sixth Bureau of the Home Ministry", after which it was again known as the Museum and then the "Museum of the Museum Bureau". It was renamed the Imperial Museum in 1888, reflecting its change of ownership of the imperial household. As other museums opened, this changed to the more specific Tokyo Imperial Household Museum (Tōkyō Teishitsu Hakubutsukan) in 1900. Following the government reforms imposed after World War II, it was renamed the "National Museum" in 1947 and the "Tokyo National Museum" in 2001. The museum is also sometimes known as the "Ueno Museum".

== History ==
=== Yushima Seido Exhibition ===
The Tokyo National Museum is the oldest national museum in Japan. It considers its origin to have been the Yushima Seido or Shoheizaka Exhibition, a public exhibition of imperial artwork and scientific specimens held by the Ministry of Education's Museum Department from 10 March to 30 April 1872 during the 5th year of the Meiji Era. The items' authenticity had been ascertained by the recent Jinshin Survey, which catalogued and verified various imperial, noble, and temple holdings around the country. Directed by Shigenobu Okuma, Tsunetami Sano, and others, the 1872 exhibition expanded on an 1871 exhibit at the Tokyo Kaisei School (today the University of Tokyo) in order to prepare for an international exhibition at the 1873 Vienna World's Fair celebrating Franz Joseph I's 25th year as emperor. Japan decided to honor their invitation primarily in order to raise the international standing of Japanese manufactures and boost exports; 24 engineers were also sent with the delegation to study cutting-edge Western engineering at the fair for use in Japanese industry. The most important products of each province were listed and two specimens of each were collected, one for display in Vienna and the other for preservation and display at a new museum. The 1872 exhibition, held at the Taiseiden Hall of the former Confucian temple at Yushima Seido in the Shoheizaka neighborhood, was open daily 9 am to 4 pm and ultimately admitted about 150,000 people. The 1873 exhibition in Vienna, apart from the collection of regional objects, also included a full Japanese garden with shrine, a model of the former pagoda at Tokyo's imperial temple, the female golden shachi from Nagoya Castle, and a papier-maché copy of the Kamakura Buddha. The next year, Sano compiled a report on the fair in 96 volumes divided into 16 parts. Gottfried Wagener, a German scientist then working in Tokyo, wrote its reports on "The Art Museum in Respect to Arts and Various Crafts" and "The Establishment of the Tokyo Museum", arguing strongly for the creation of a museum on western lines in the Japanese capital.

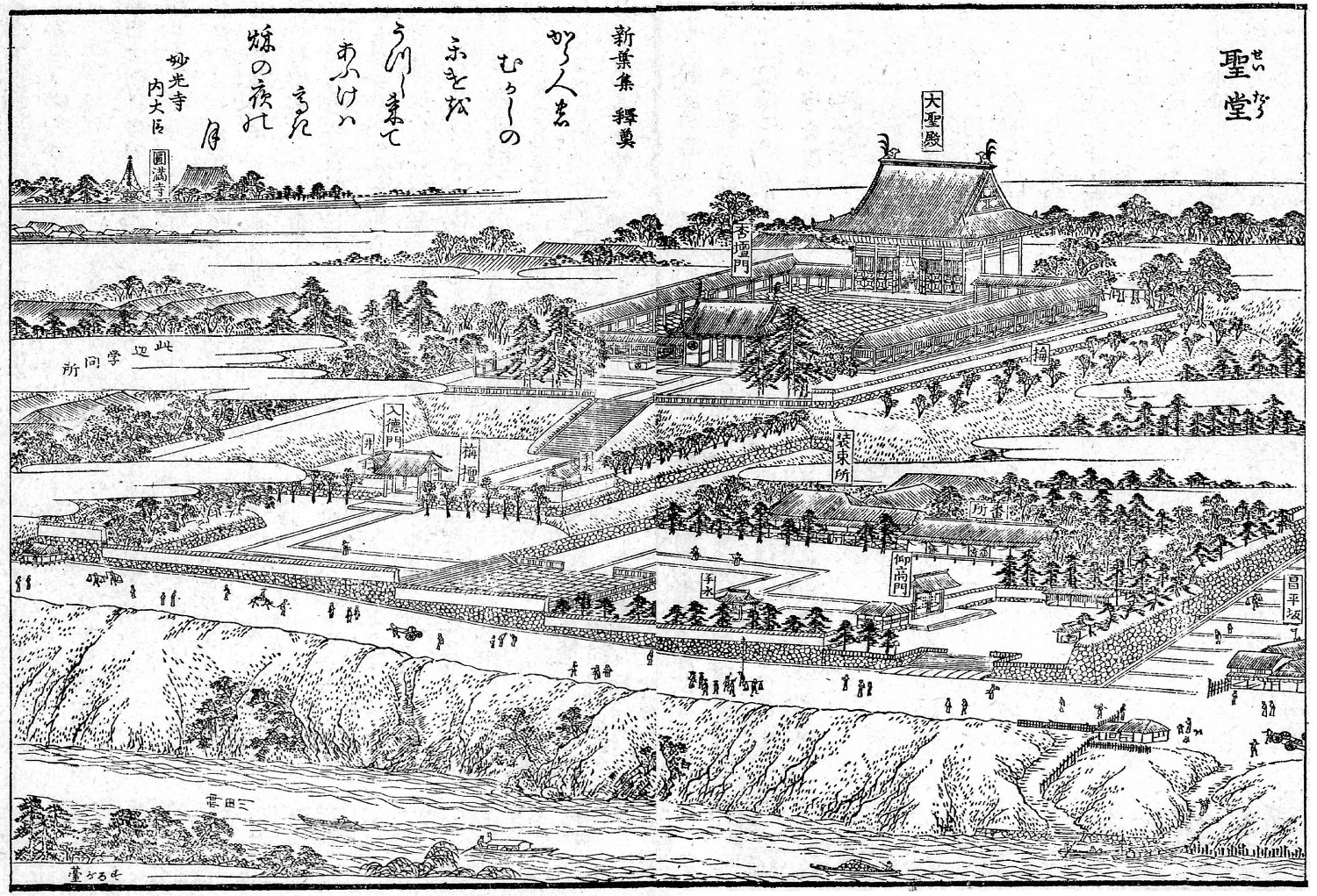
The old Yushima Seido (1830)

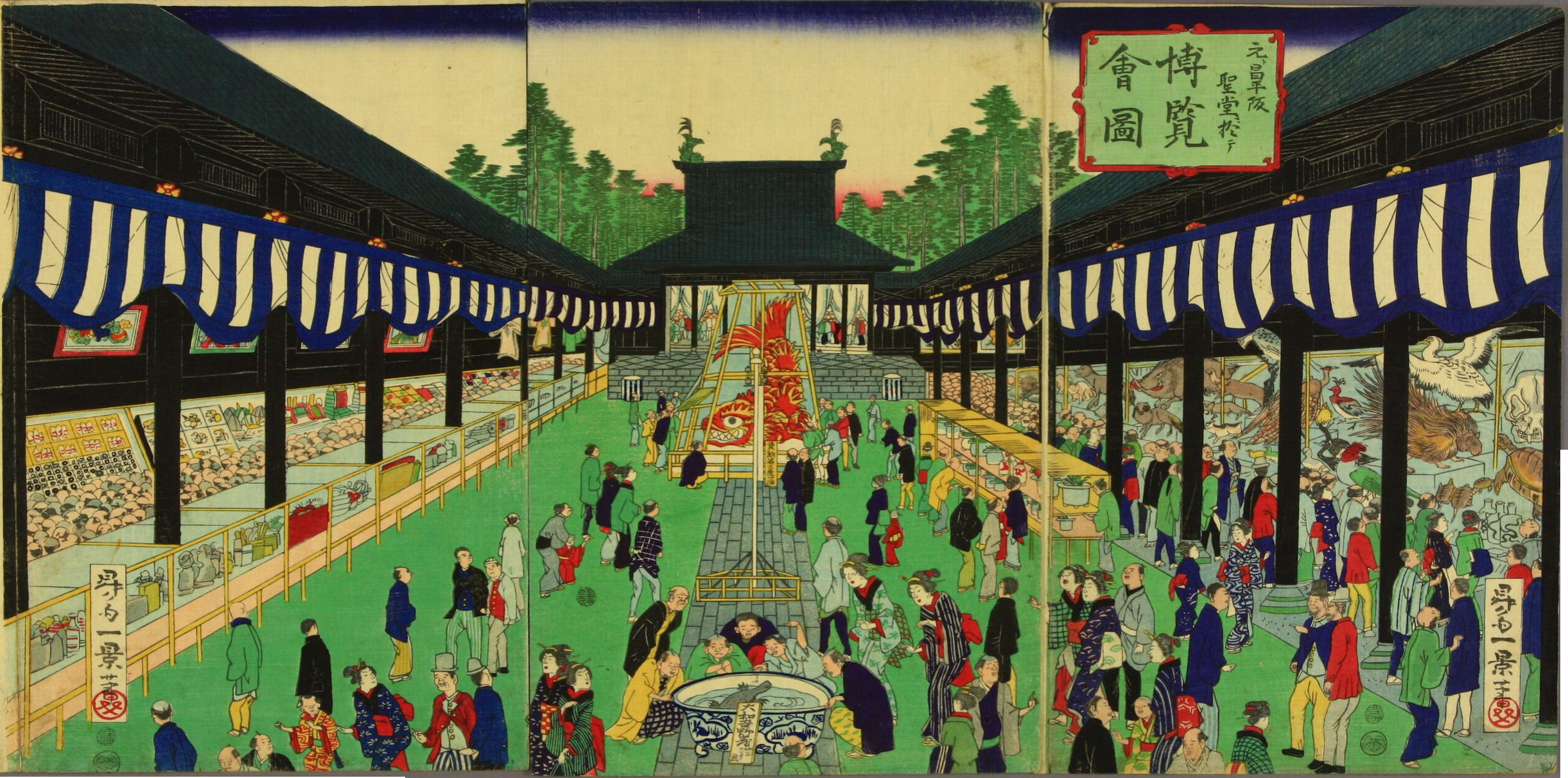
The 1872 Yushima Seido Exhibition. Ikkei Shosai's ukiyo-e triptych

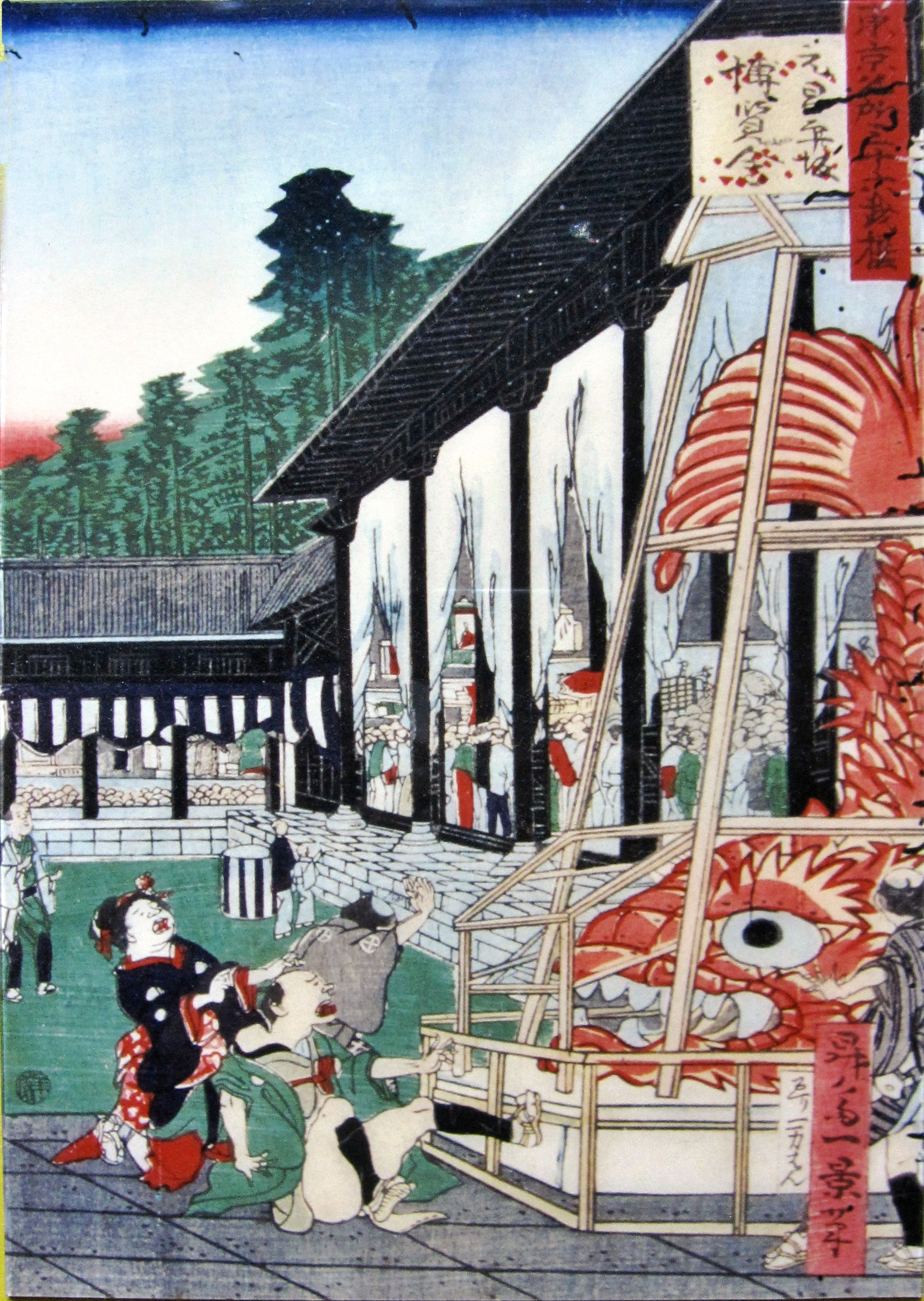
The male shachi of the Nagoya Castle at the exhibition. Shosai's ukiyo-e print.

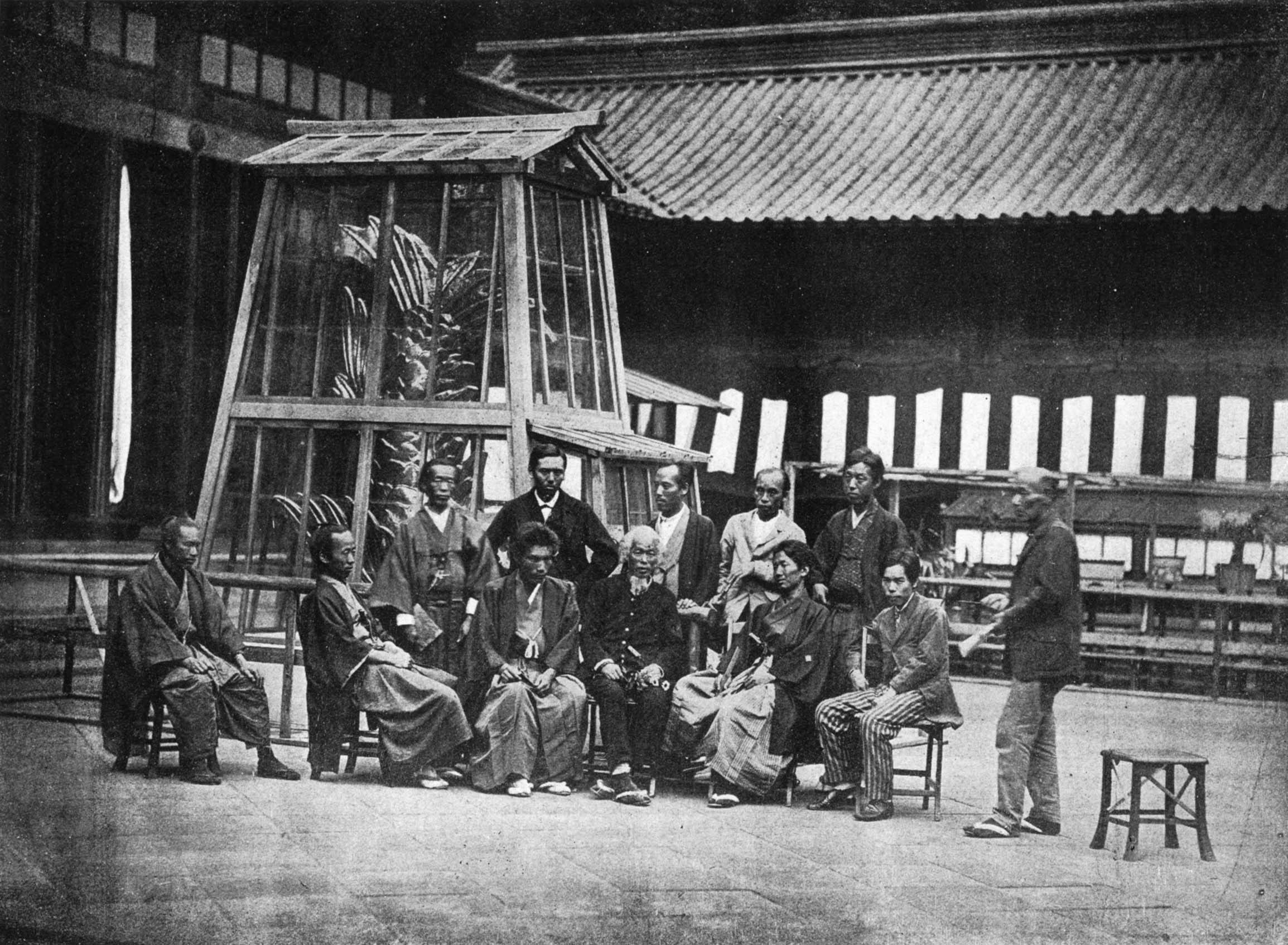
Directors of the exposition, before the golden shachi in the Taiseiden courtyard (1872)

=== Uchiyamashita museum ===
While the Vienna World Fair was going on, the locally-held objects were organized by the Exposition Bureau into a temporary display at a compound in Uchiyamashita-chō (now 1-Chome in Uchisaiwai-chō), immediately southeast of the Imperial Palace, in March 1873. It opened on 15 April and was open to the public for the next 3½ months, after which it opened on the days in each month ending with the numbers 1 or 6. A special exhibition in 1874 focused on new technology in medicine, chemistry, and physics. On 30 March 1875, the museum was moved under the Home Ministry. By this time, it included seven buildings—including a greenhouse—with displays covering Japanese antiques, agriculture, and the natural sciences; the grounds had an area for livestock and a room for bears. The museum continued to be connected to industry and was closely involved with the national industrial exhibitions held in Ueno Park in 1877, 1881, and 1890.

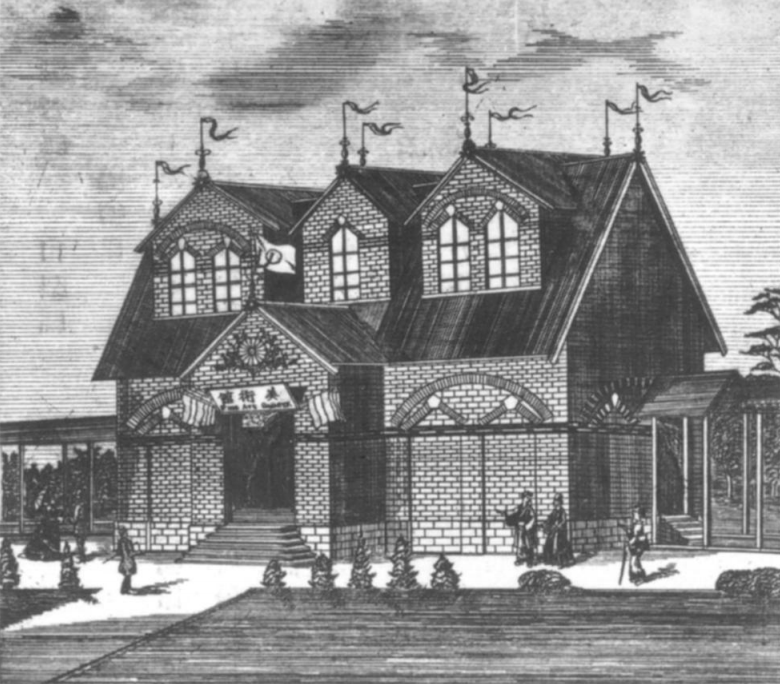
An engraving of the Art Gallery for the first National Industrial Exhibition (1877)

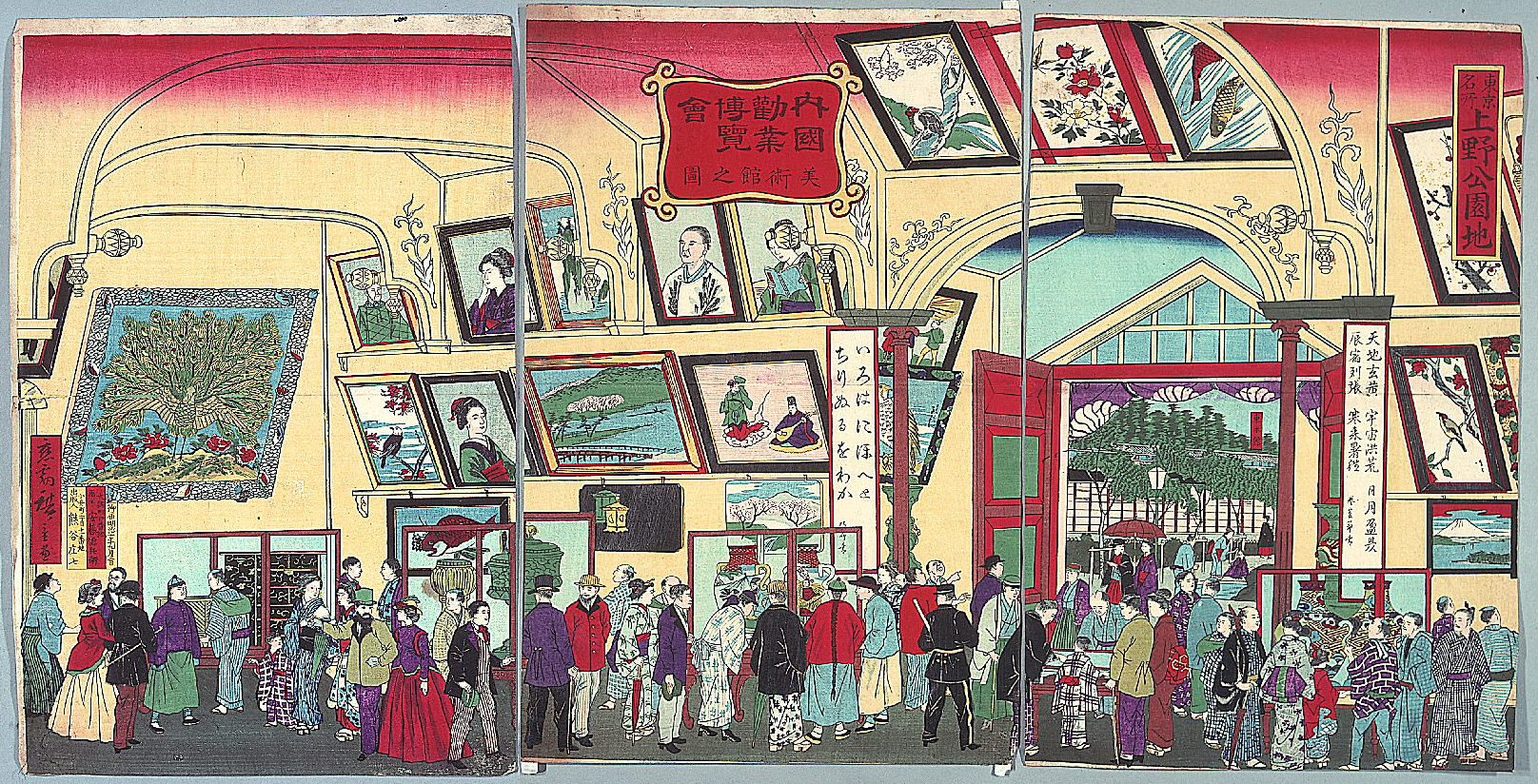
Hiroshige III's ukiyo-e triptych showing its interior (1877)

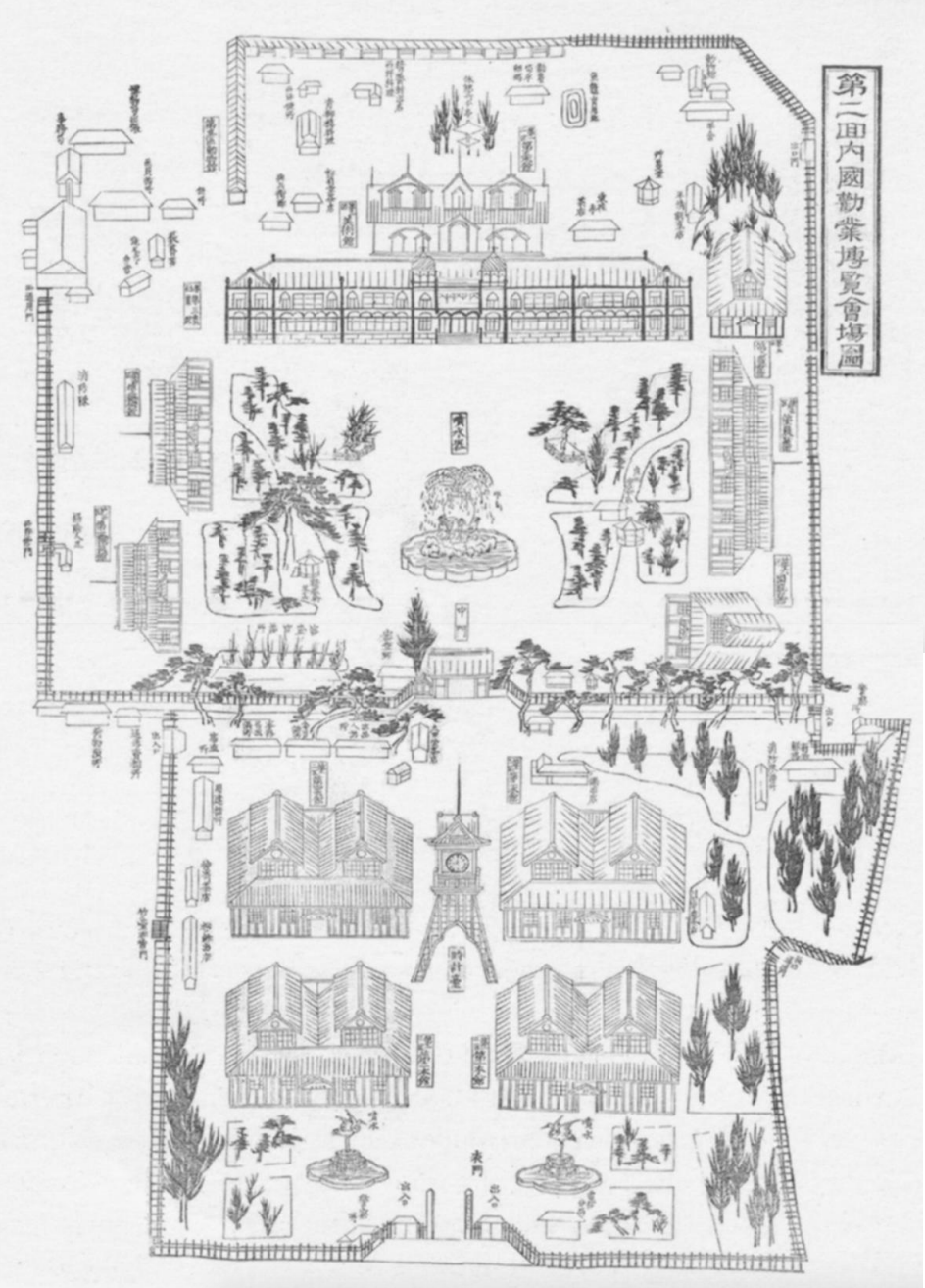
Guide map to the 1881 Second National Industrial Exhibition

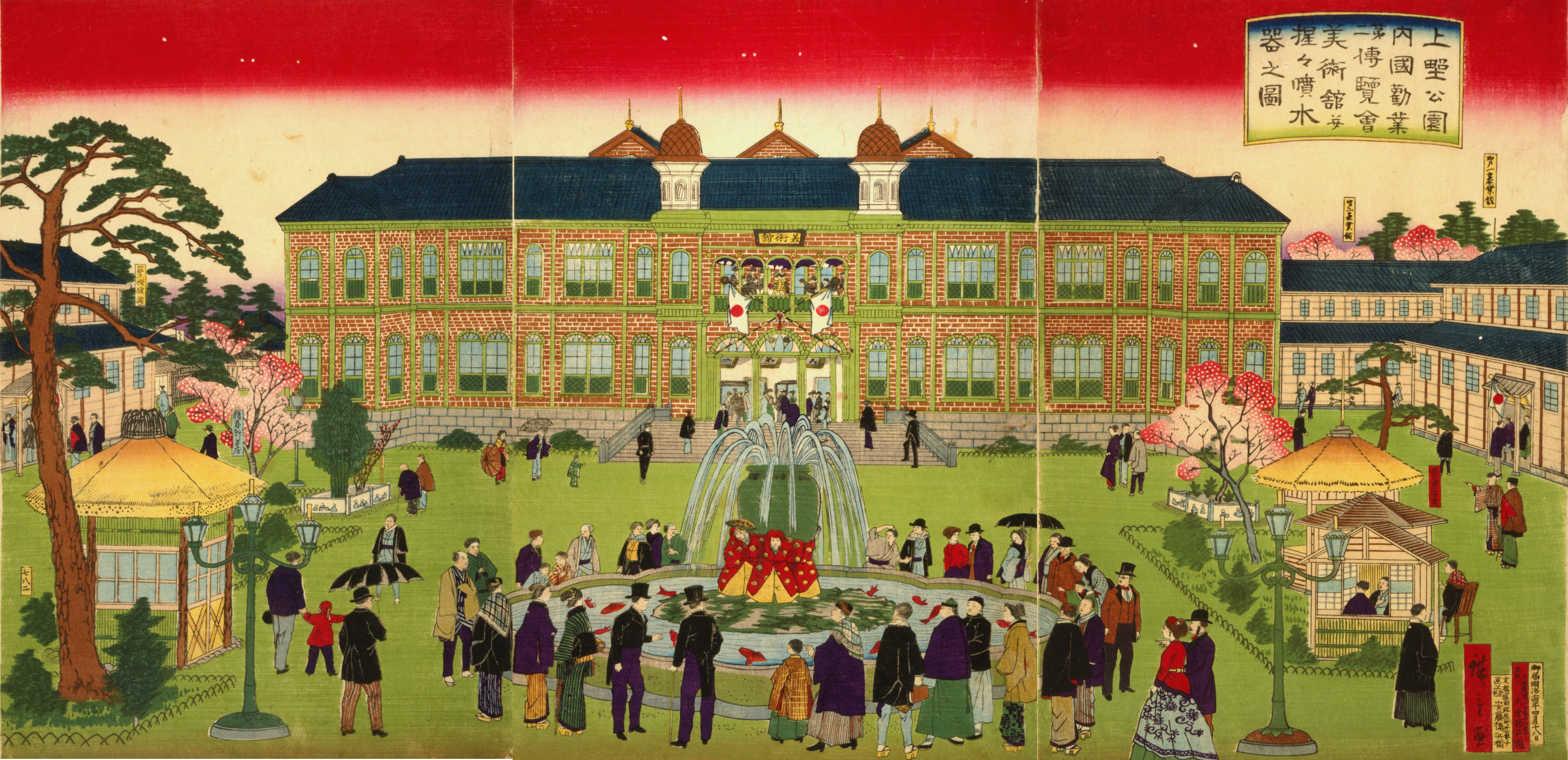
Hiroshige III's ukiyo-e triptych of the second NIE (1881), showing the original Honkan

=== Ueno museum ===
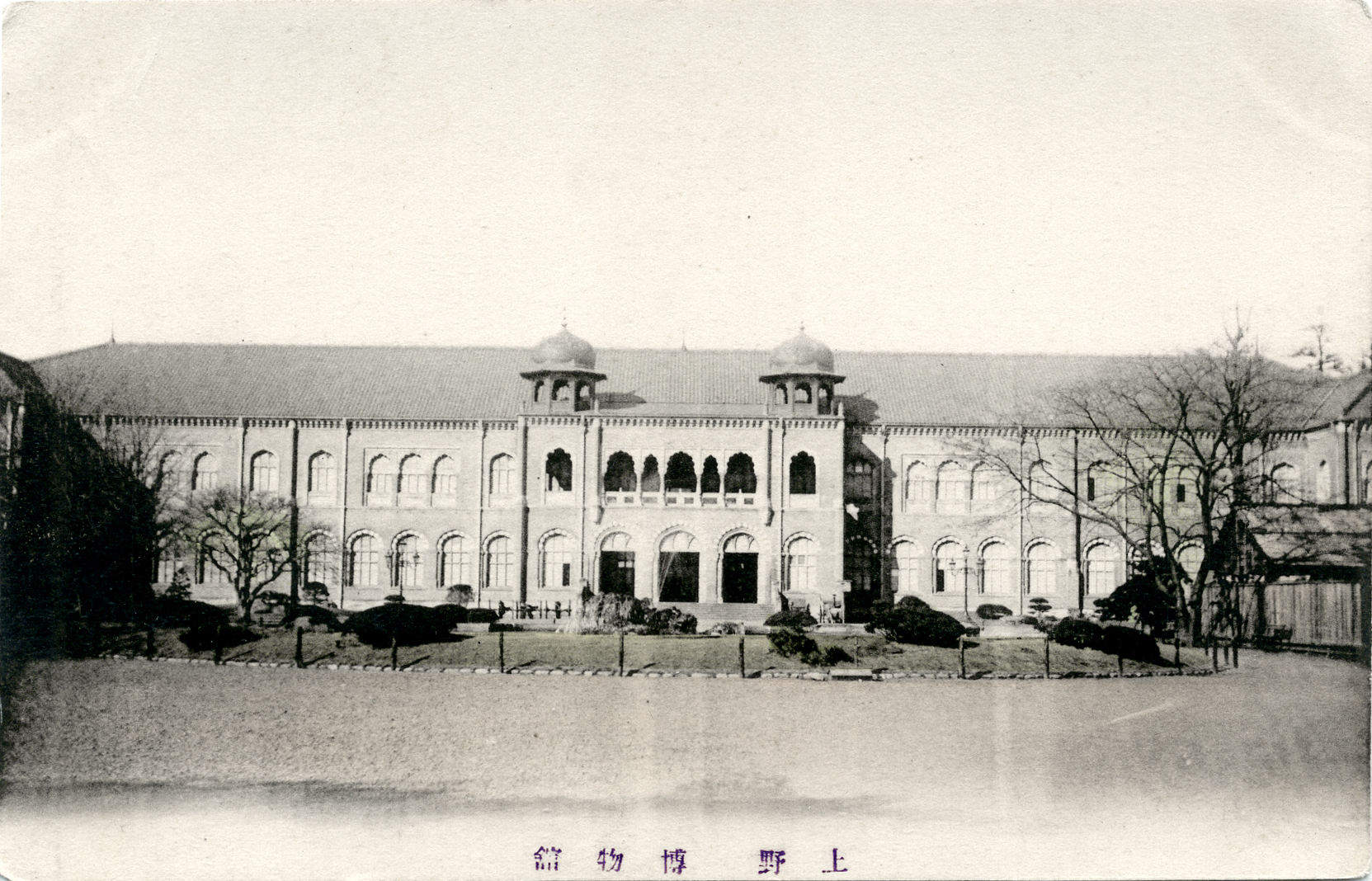
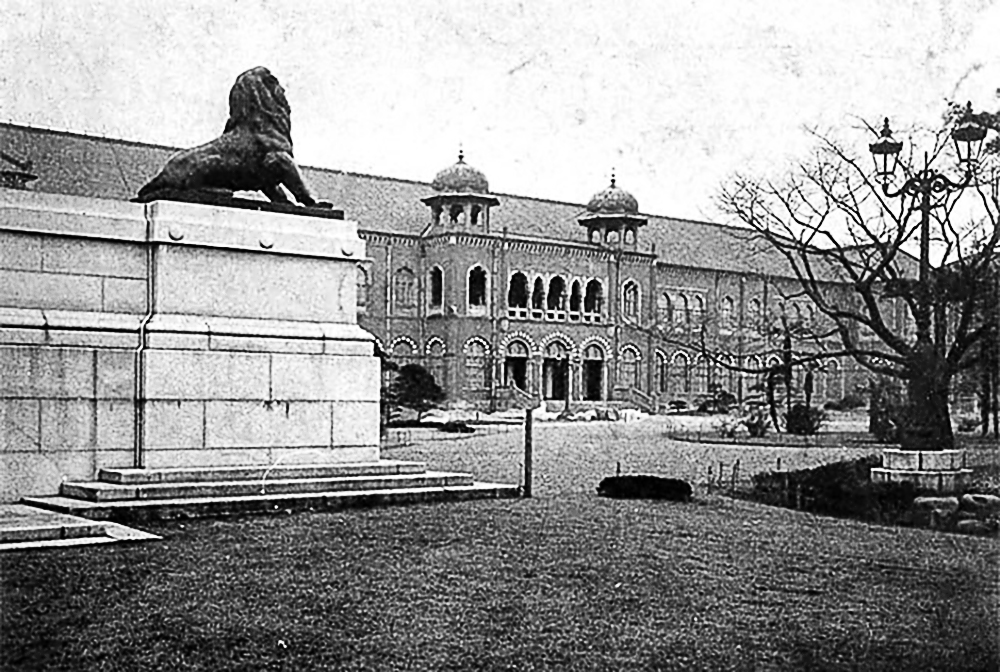
Two photographs of the main building of the museum (c. 1910)

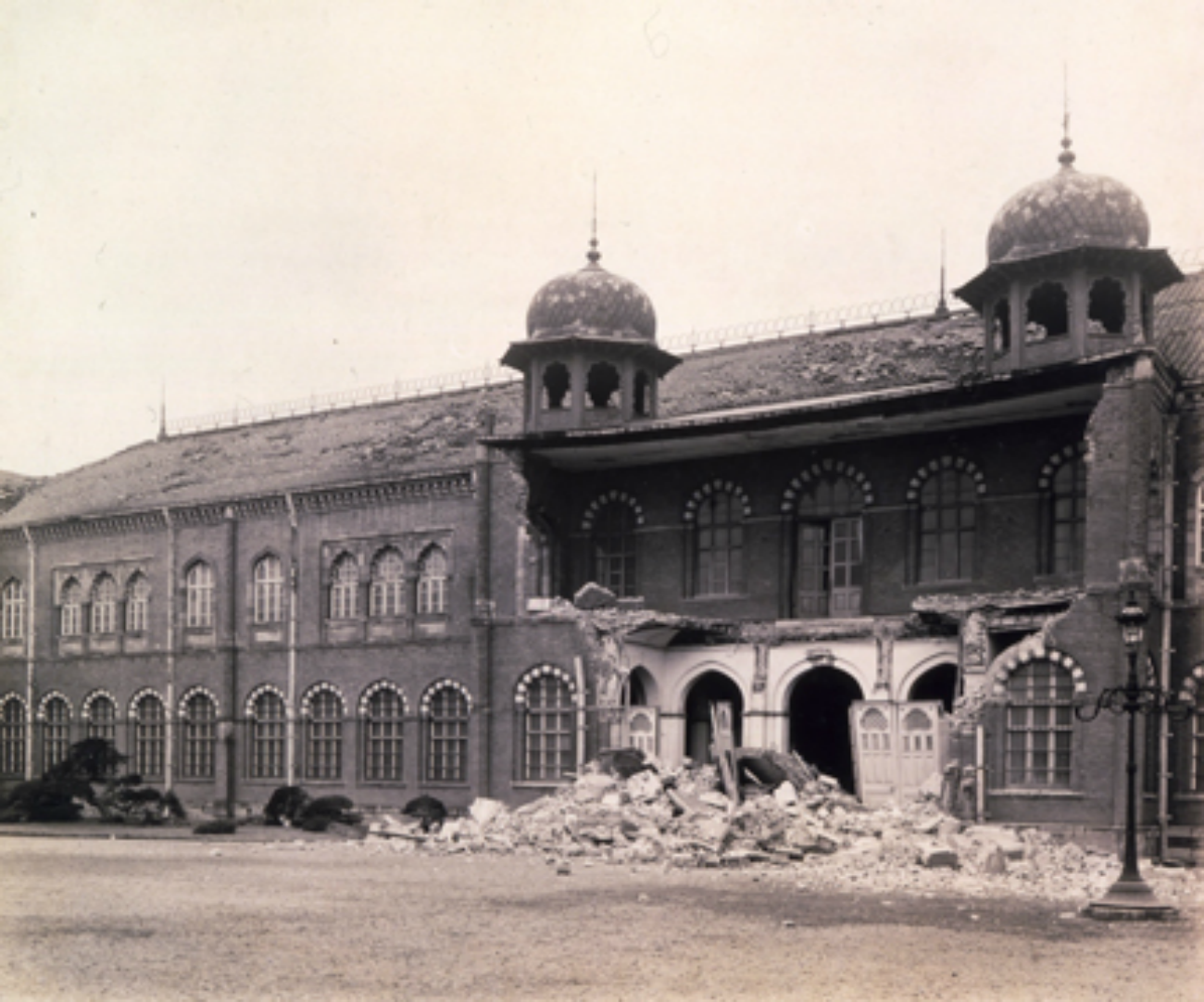
The front of the original Honkan after the Great Kanto Earthquake (1923)

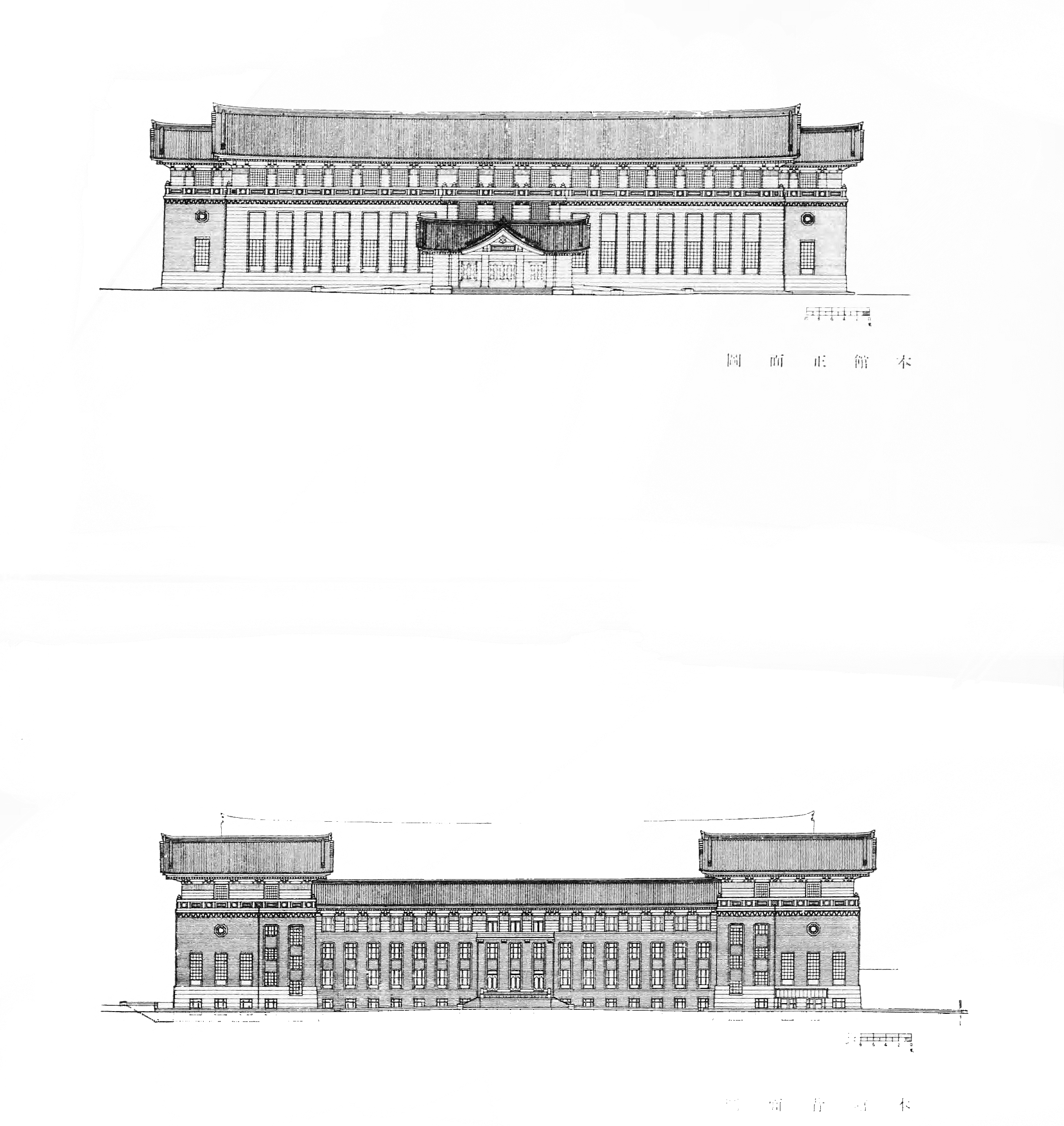
Jin Watanabe's 1937 plans for the second Honkan, front and side elevations

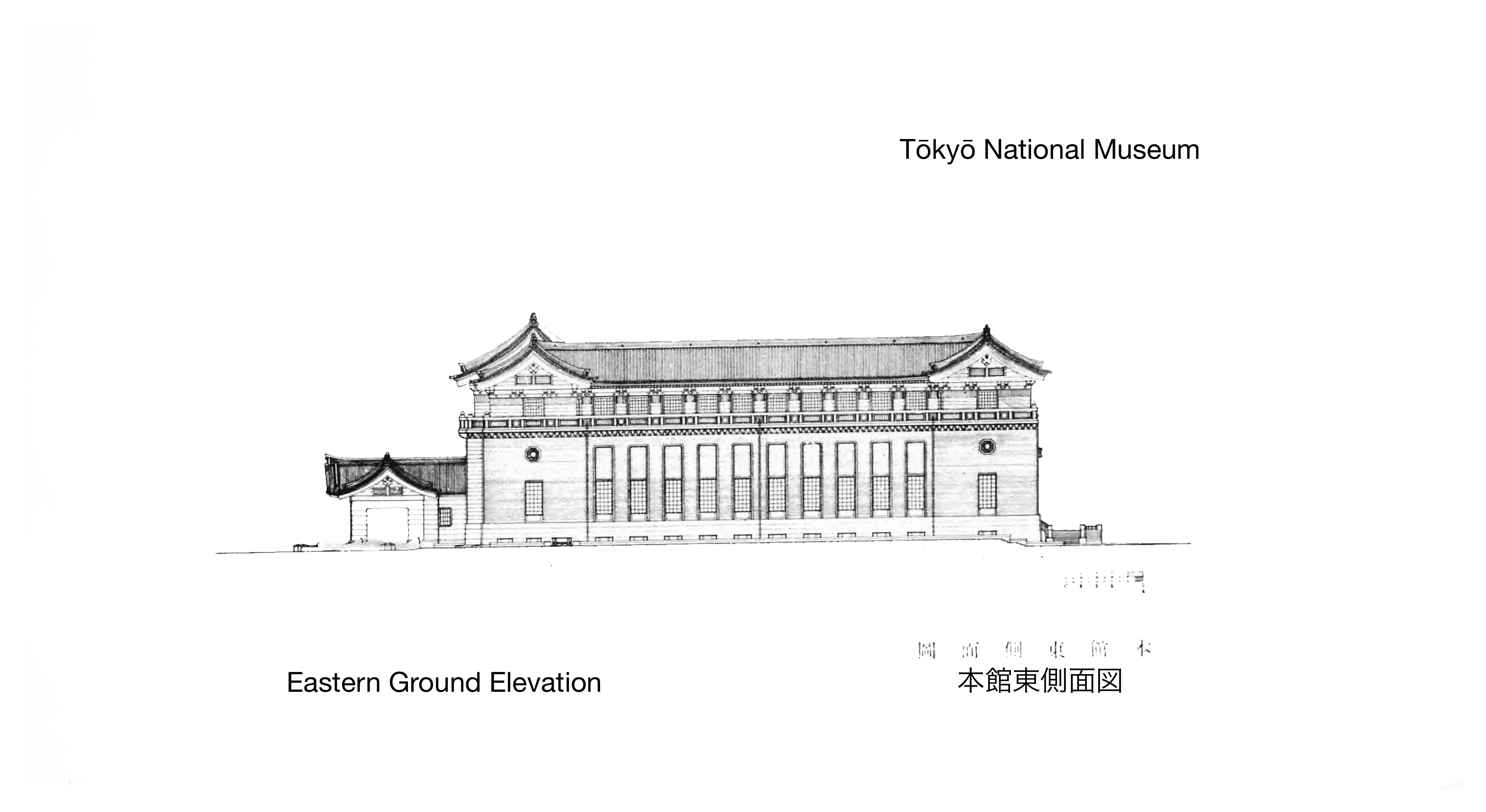
East elevation

Ueno Park was founded in 1873 on land that had been held by the metropolitan government since the destruction of most of the Kaneiji Temple during the Boshin War that established the Meiji Restoration, partially following the example set by the American government at Yellowstone the preceding year. Hisanari Machida, the museum's first director, had advocated the use of the spacious park for a wide-ranging museum as early as 1873 but parts of it were used for the military and education ministries until 1875, when the Home Ministry acquired complete control. The museum's early conception was based on the South Kensington Museum (now the Victoria & Albert Museum) in London, but important changes were made. The museum collections were divided into the eight categories of fine arts, nature, agriculture & forestry, history, law, education, industry, and land & sea. The ministry gave the entire park to the museum in January 1876 but its facilities there weren't completed until 1881, when the original Honkan was completed in time for the Second National Industrial Exhibition; the smaller brick building used by the first National Industrial Exhibition in 1877 was incorporated into this as a wing. In April 1881, the museum was moved from the Home Ministry to the Ministry of Agriculture and Trade. It began construction on the associated zoo and added the Asakusa Bunko collection to the museum as its book department.

A ceremony attended by Emperor Meiji opened the museum and zoo on 20 March 1882; the library was reopened on September 30. The facilities were open to the public every day except Mondays and two days around the New Year. In 1888 or 1889, the imperial household took over ownership of the museum, focusing its operations on cultural and scientific pursuits and ending its direct involvement with trade and industry. The original Honkan was severely damaged in the Great Kanto earthquake of 1923, and exhibits were moved to the undamaged Hyokeikan. The structure having originally been promoted as having "solidity... matched by no other" in Japan, its collapse led to disillusionment with the architecture and style it represented.

Upon the marriage of Hirohito in 1924, the entire Ueno Park—along with the museum and the zoo—were returned to the Tokyo Municipal Government as a present. While the main building's reconstruction was being discussed, the natural science collections were removed from the museum in 1925 to form the separate Tokyo Museum of the Ministry of Education (the present-day National Science Museum). An Imperial Museum Innovation Promotion Committee was assembled the next year following the ascension of Hirohito as emperor, which ultimately decided to replace the former building. In 1931, they held a design contest and selected the Imperial-Crown plan from Jin Watanabe.

The present Honkan was opened to the public in 1938, having reorganized its collection to dissolve the history department and classify its holdings as art. In November 1940, the Shosoin were publicly displayed for the first time to celebrate the supposed 2600th anniversary of the ascension of the first emperor of Japan. 400,000 came to see them during the 20-day exhibit.

The museum saw attendance begin to fall after 1925; it was closed in 1945 during the final phases of the Second World War. It was placed under the Ministry of Education in 1947, the Independent Administrative Institution National Museum in 2001 (merging its administration with the Kyoto, Nara, and—in 2005—Kyushu National Museums), and the Independent Administrative Institution National Institutes for Cultural Heritage in 2007 (merging the IAINM's administration with the national institutes for cultural preservation in Tokyo and Nara).

From October 18, 2022 to December 11, the Tokyo National Museum celebrated its 150 year anniversary by displaying all of its 89 national treasures in a single exhibition for the first time.

== Facilities ==
=== Honkan (Japanese Gallery) ===
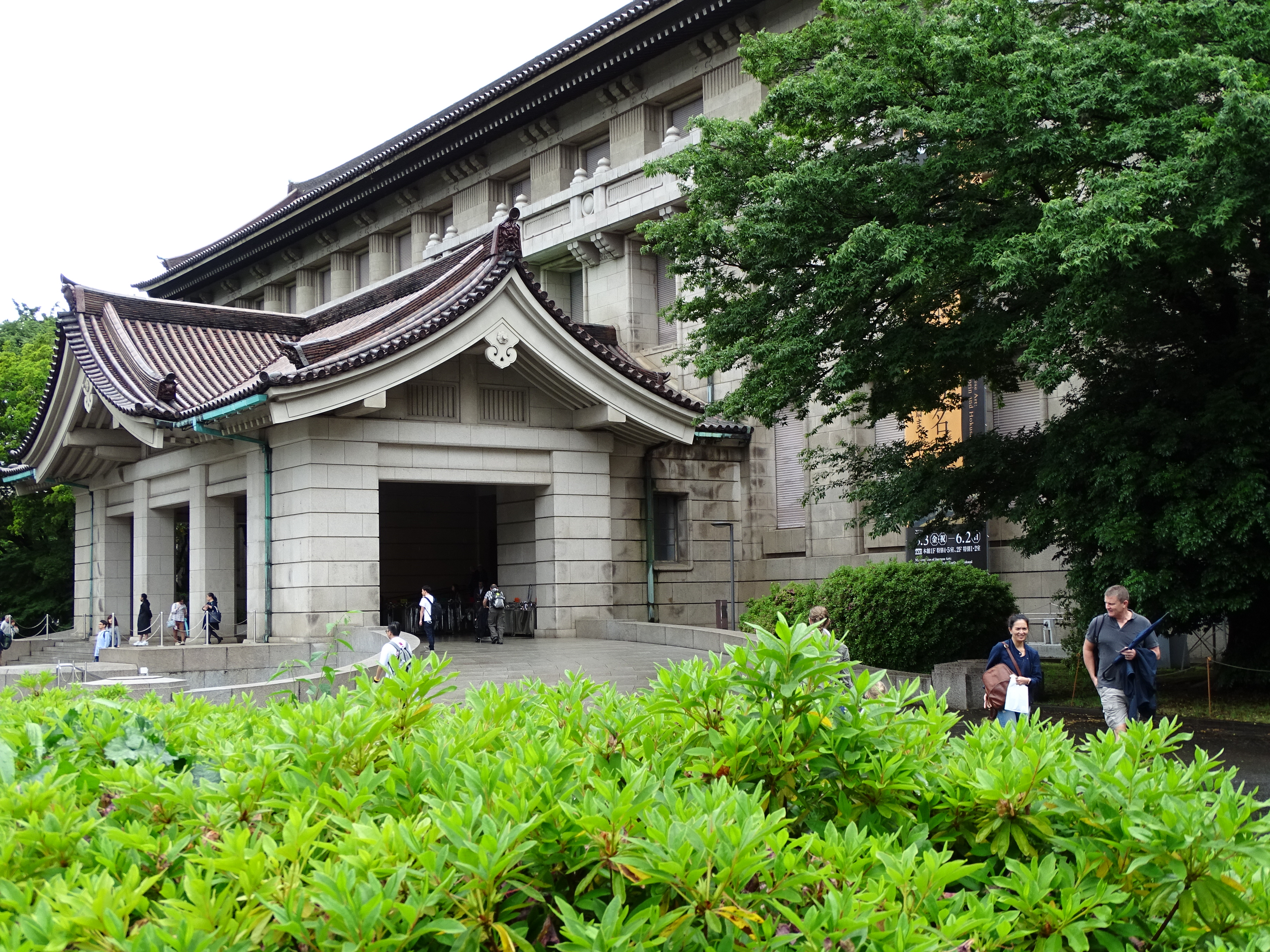
The entrance to the Honkan (May 2019)

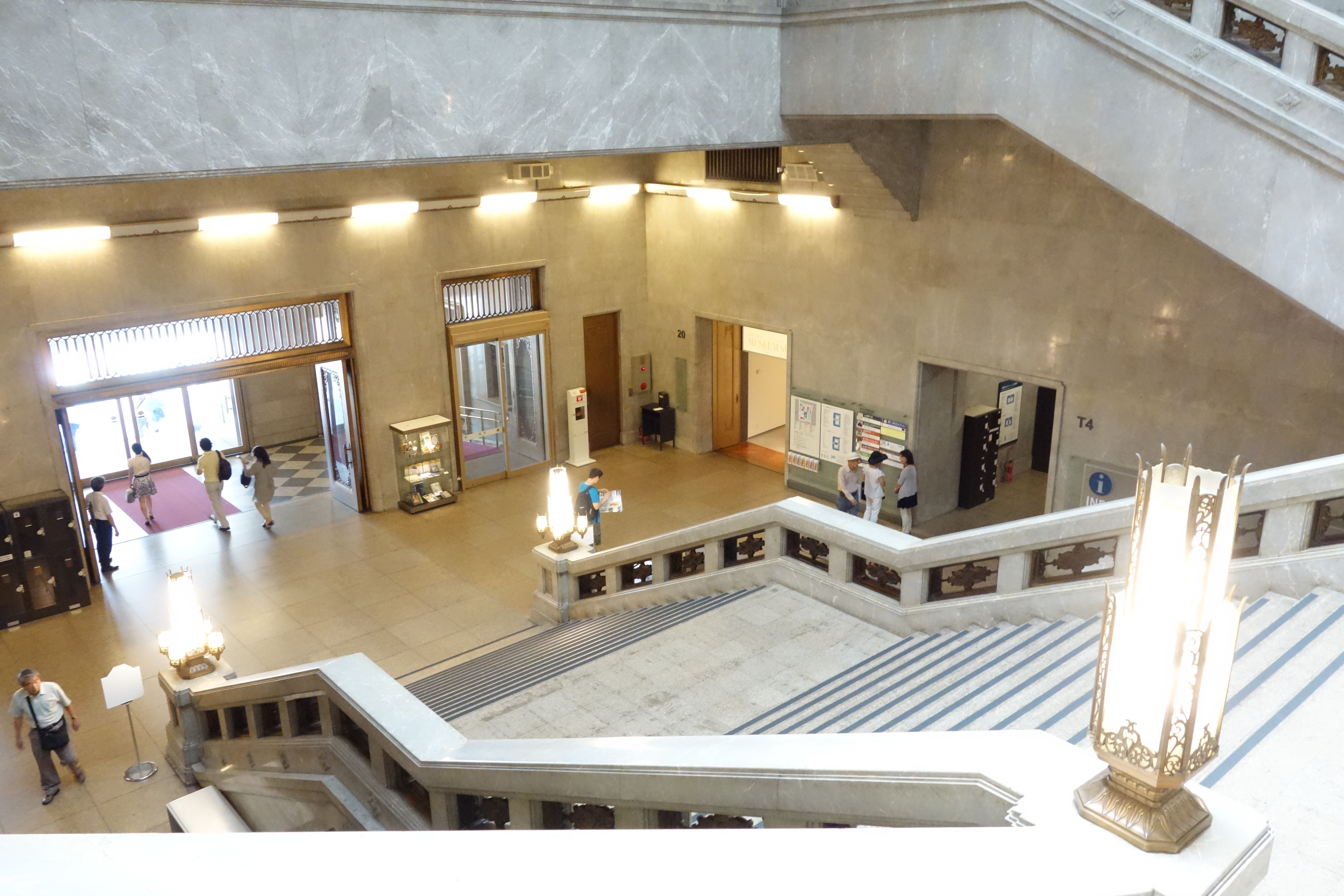
The Honkan entryway, seen from the second floor landing (2013)

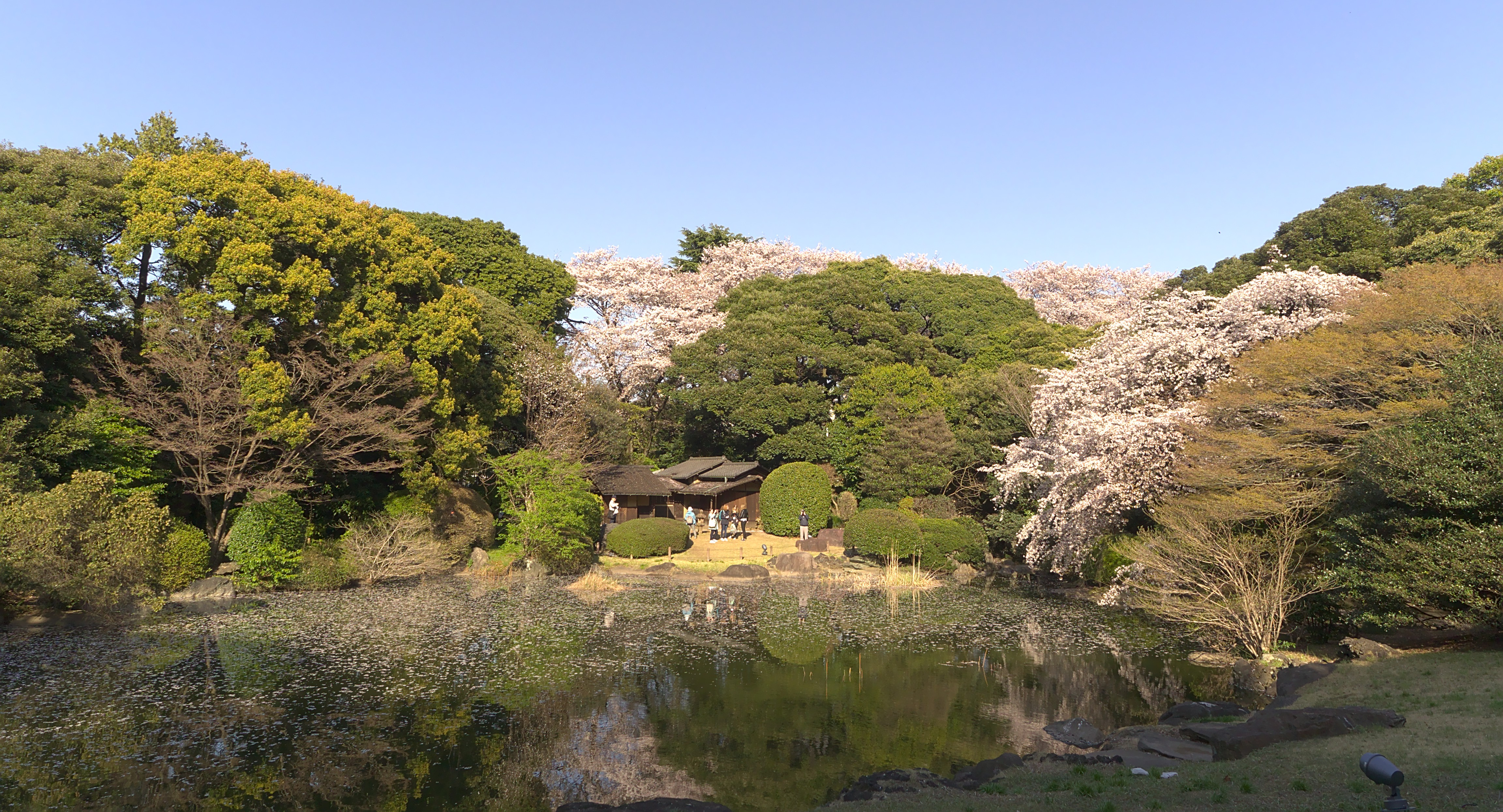
The TNM garden seen from the Honkan terrace (March 2018)

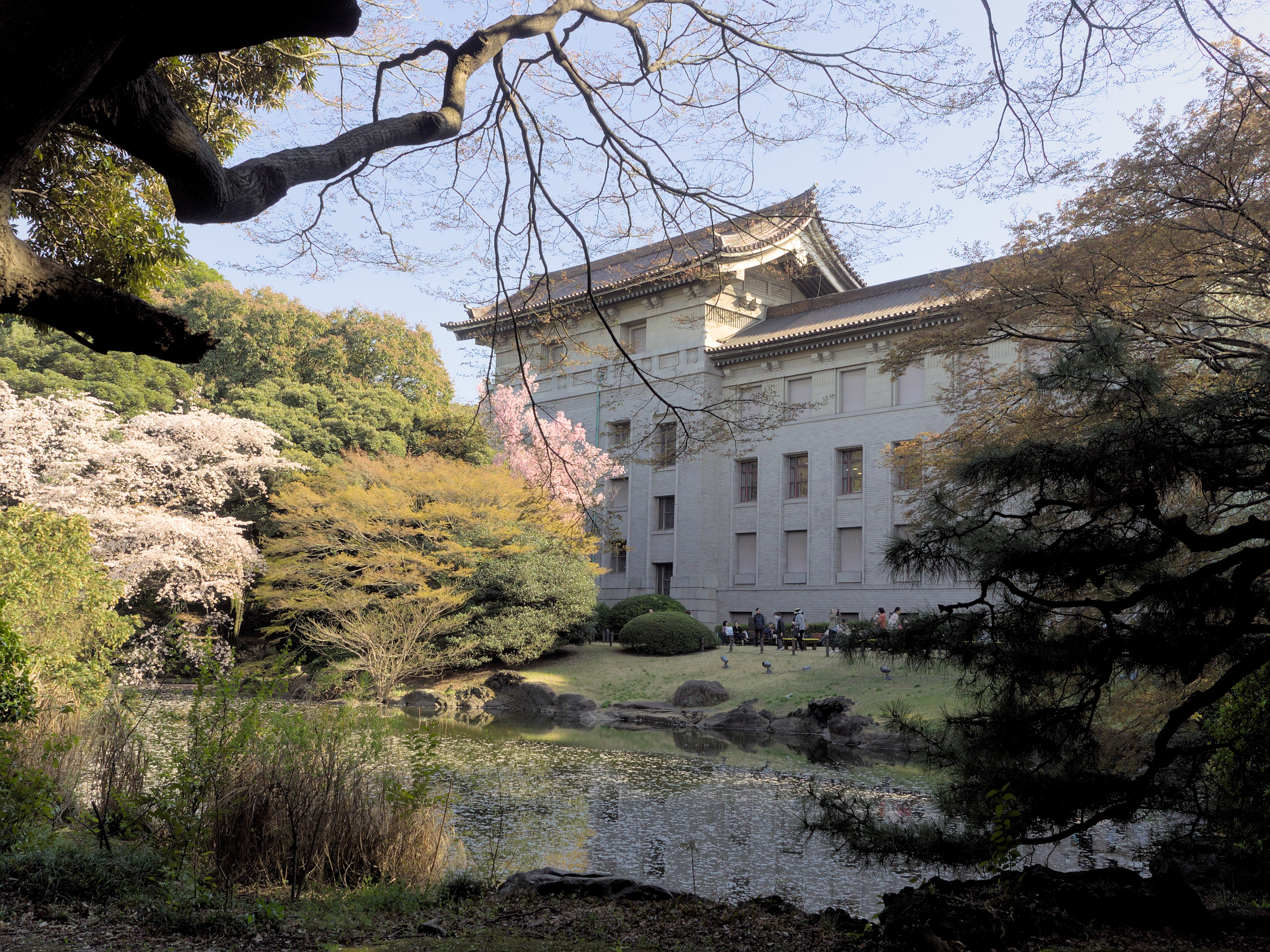
The rear of the Honkan seen from the garden (March 2018)

The Honkan (本館, Main or Japanese Gallery) houses the museum's main display of Japanese art from prehistory to the late 19th century. It has two floors and a basement with a total floorspace of 21,500 m^{2} (231,000 sq ft). It is designed to be fire- and earthquake-resistant.

The Honkan is located on the former site of the main hall of the Kaneiji Temple, which was destroyed during the Boshin War. The first Honkan incorporated a brick structure used as the main hall for the first National Industrial Exhibition in 1877. Construction on its replacement began the next year, following plans drawn up by the English architect Josiah Conder. The two-story brick hall incorporated Anglo-Indian architecture, with two green onion domes surmounting the towers flanking the main entrance. It was completed in 1881. This building was ruined by the Great Kanto earthquake of 1923.

It was replaced by Jin Watanabe's reinforced-concrete structure in the Imperial Crown Style, with a neoclassical base and Japanese roof. It was completed from 1932 to 1938 at a cost of 7 million yen. It opened on 10 November 1938 with a ceremony attended by Emperor Hirohito. The building was designated an Important Cultural Property of Japan in 2001.

The rooms are ordered beginning with the SE corner of the second floor, passing clockwise around the second and first floor, and ending with the SW corner of the first floor.

| Second Floor | | First Floor | |
| Room | Title | Room | Title |
|---|---|---|---|
| 1 | The Dawn of Japanese Art and Rise of Buddhism | 11 | Japanese Sculpture |
| 1 | Jomon, Yayoi, Kofun | 11 | Japanese Sculpture |
| 2 | National Treasure Gallery | 12 | Lacquerware |
| 2 | Various periods | 12 | Lacquerware |
| 3 | Buddhist Art, Courtly Art, and Zen & Ink Painting | 13 | Metalwork and Ceramics |
| 3 | Heian, Muromachi | 13 | Metalwork and Ceramics |
| 4 | The Art of Tea Ceremony | 14 | Thematic Exhibition |
| 4 | Various periods | 14 | Thematic Exhibition |
| 5 | Attire of the Military Elite | 15 | Records of History |
| 5 | Heian, Edo | 15 | Records of History |
| 6 | Attire of the Military Elite | 16 | Ainu and Ryukyu |
| 6 | Heian, Edo | 16 | Ainu and Ryukyu |
| 7 | Folding Screens and Sliding Door Paintings | 17 | Conservation and Restoration |
| 7 | Various periods | 17 | Conservation and Restoration |
| 8 | The Arts of Daily Life and Developments in Painting and Calligraphy | 18 | Modern Art |
| 8 | Azuchi-Momoyama, Edo | 18 | Modern Art |
| 9 | Noh and Kabuki | 19 | Education Space |
| 9 | Various periods | 19 | Education Space |
| 10 | Ukiyo-e and Fashion in the Edo Period | 20 | Giftshop |
| 10 | Edo | 20 | Giftshop |

The basement holds another educational space.

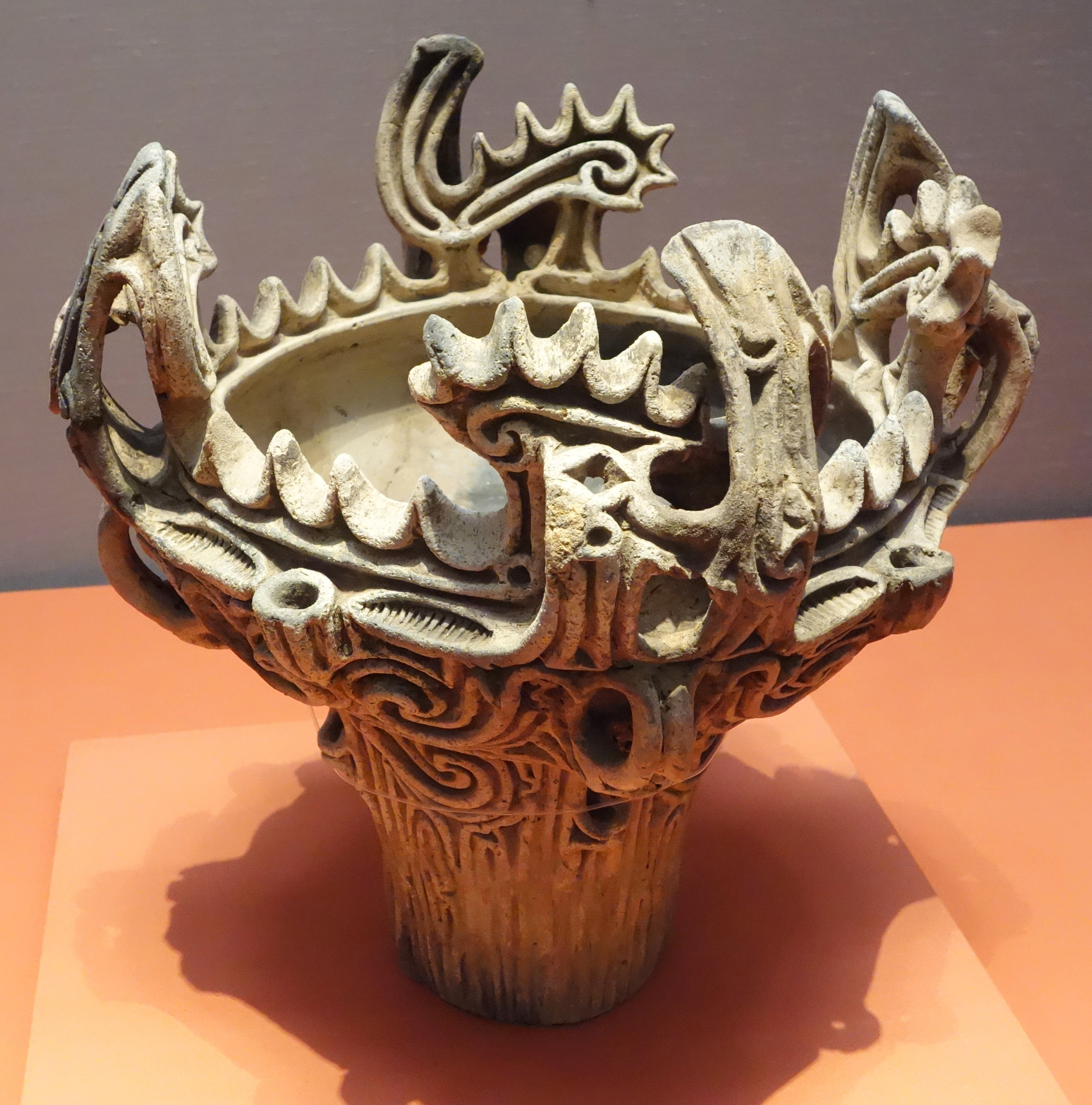
A Middle Jōmon vessel (3000–2000 BCE)

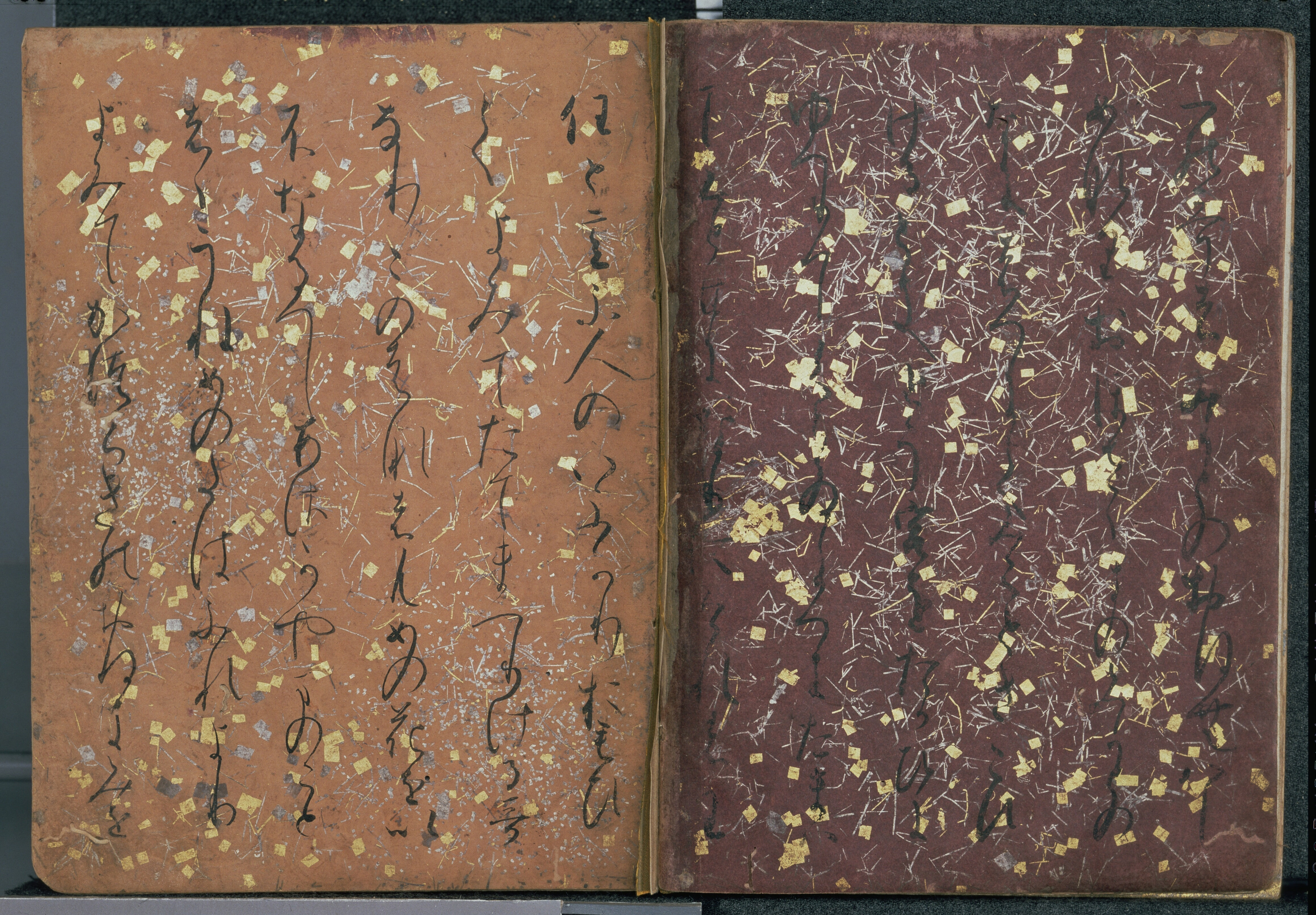
Kokin Wakashū, Heian period, 10th century

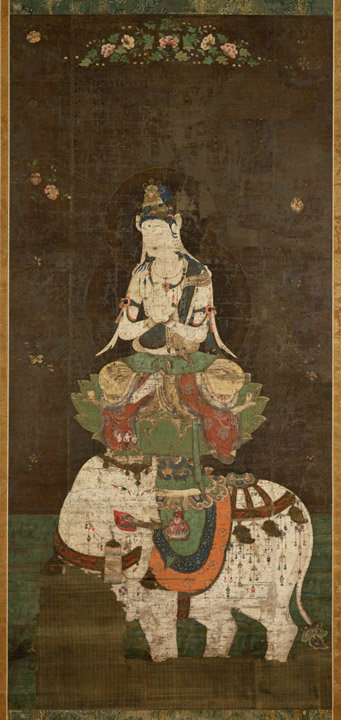
Samantabhadra, Heian period, 12th century

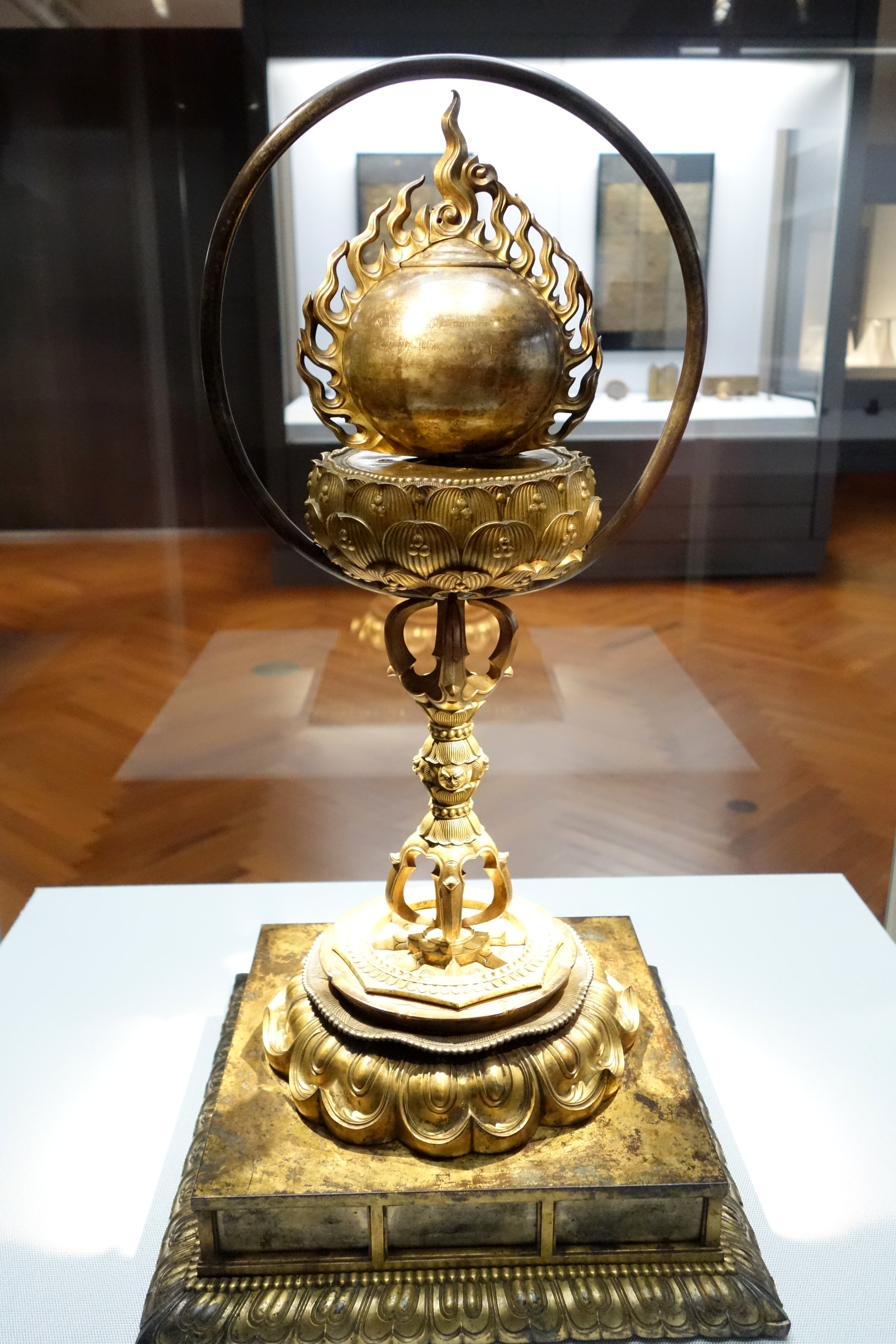
Cintamani in flame type, 12th–13th century

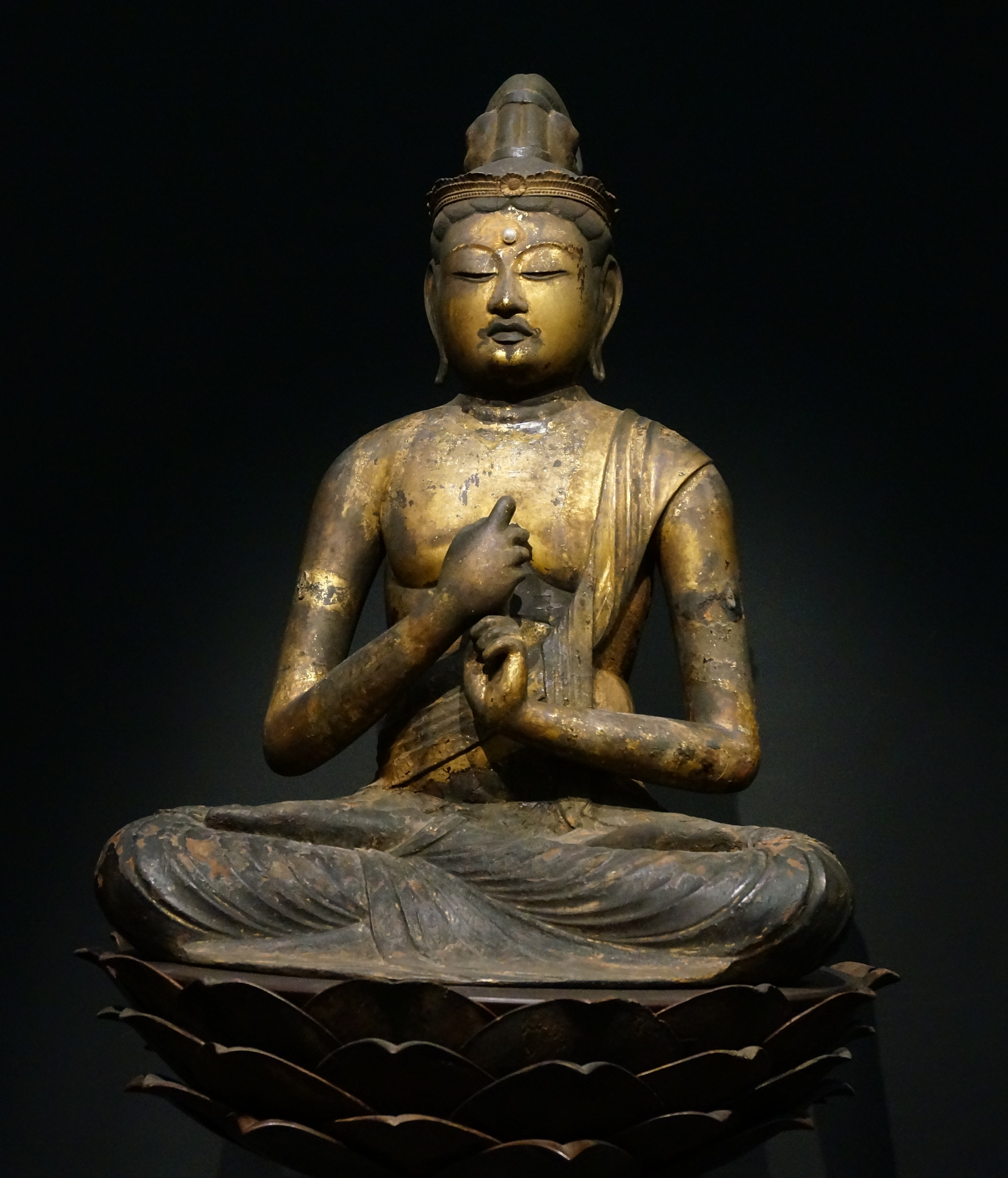
A gilt-wood statue of Vairocana Buddha, Heian period, 11th-12th century

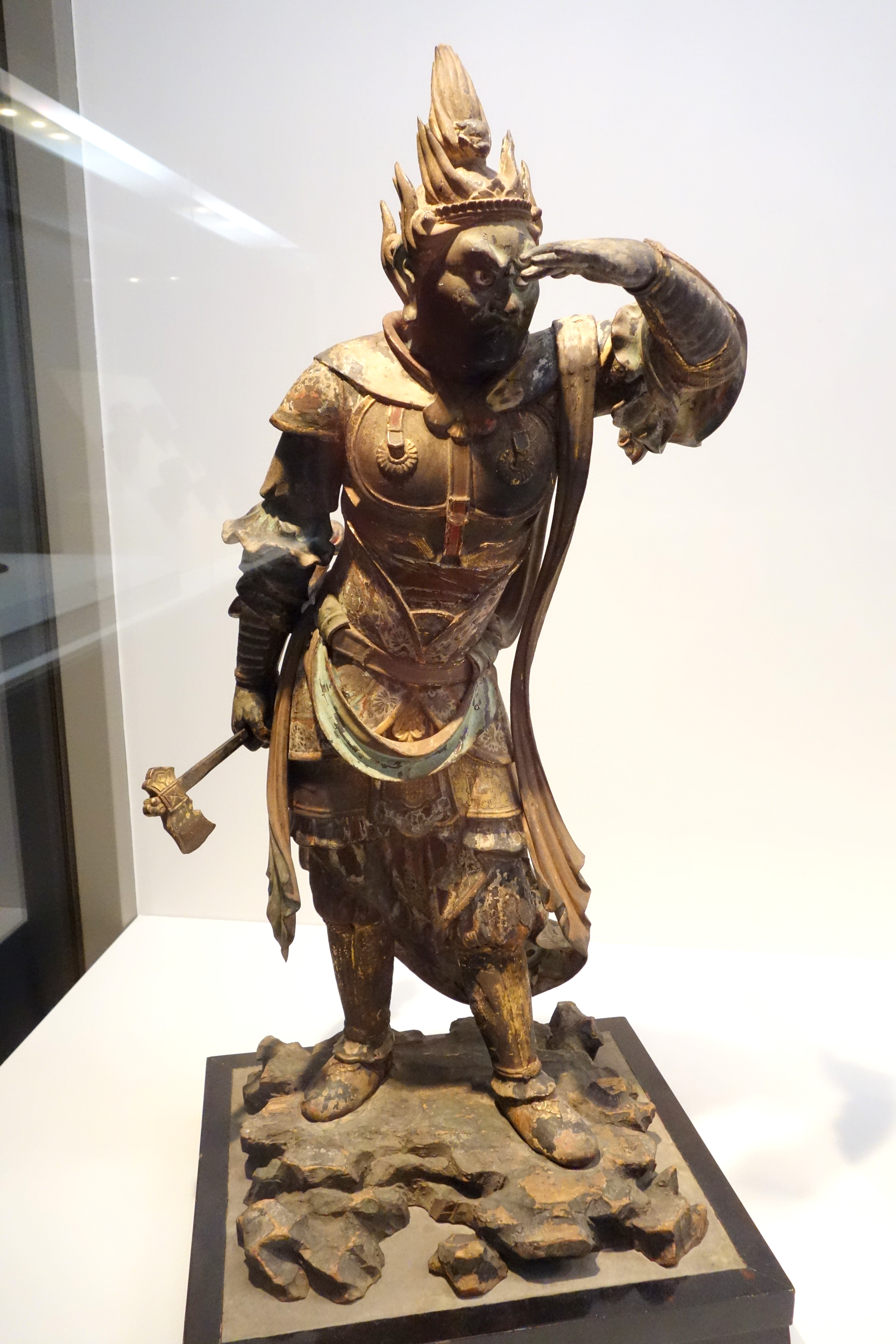
Twelve Heavenly Generals, Kamakura period, 13th century

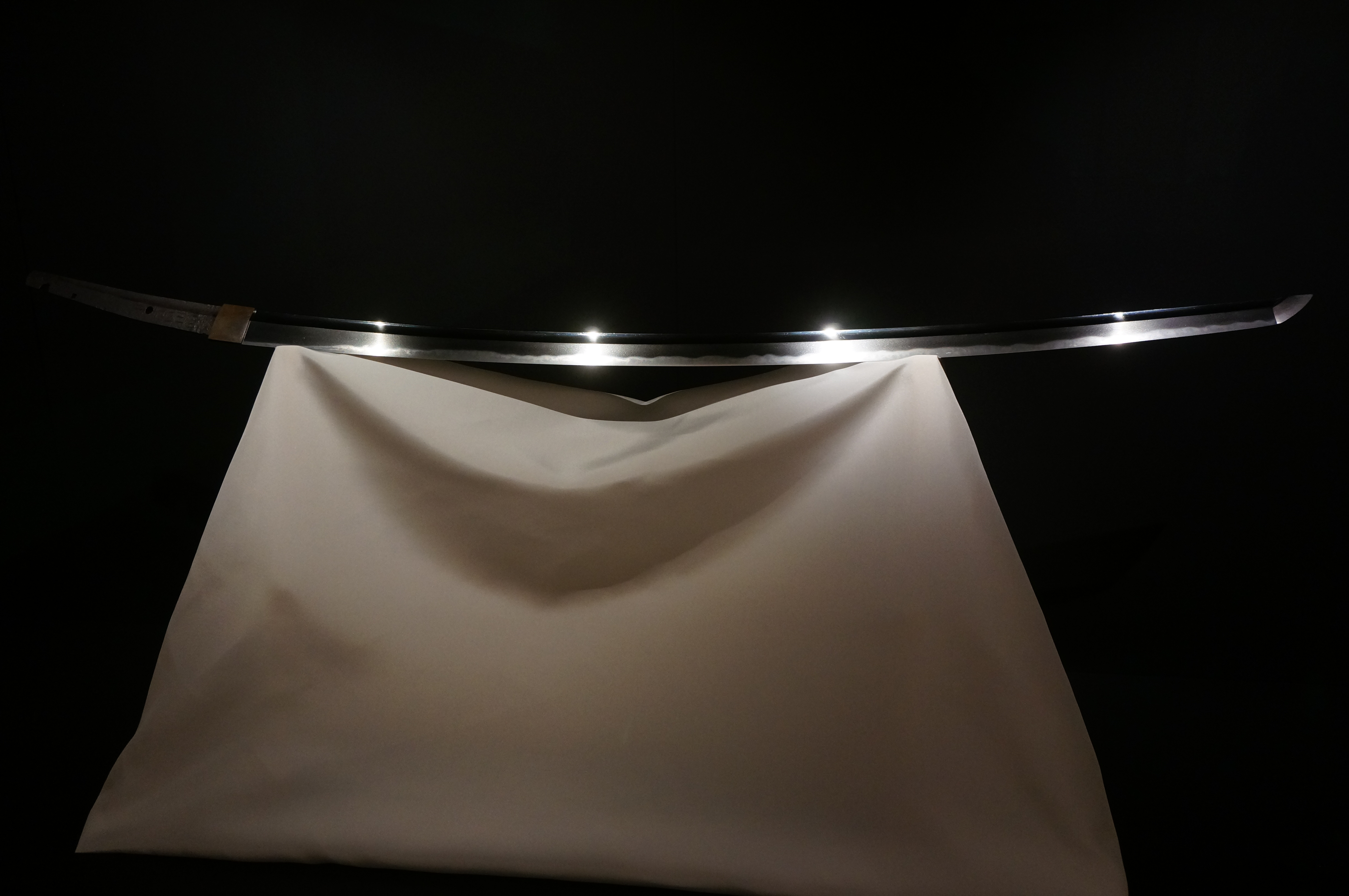
Tachi Okanehira, Heian period, 12th century

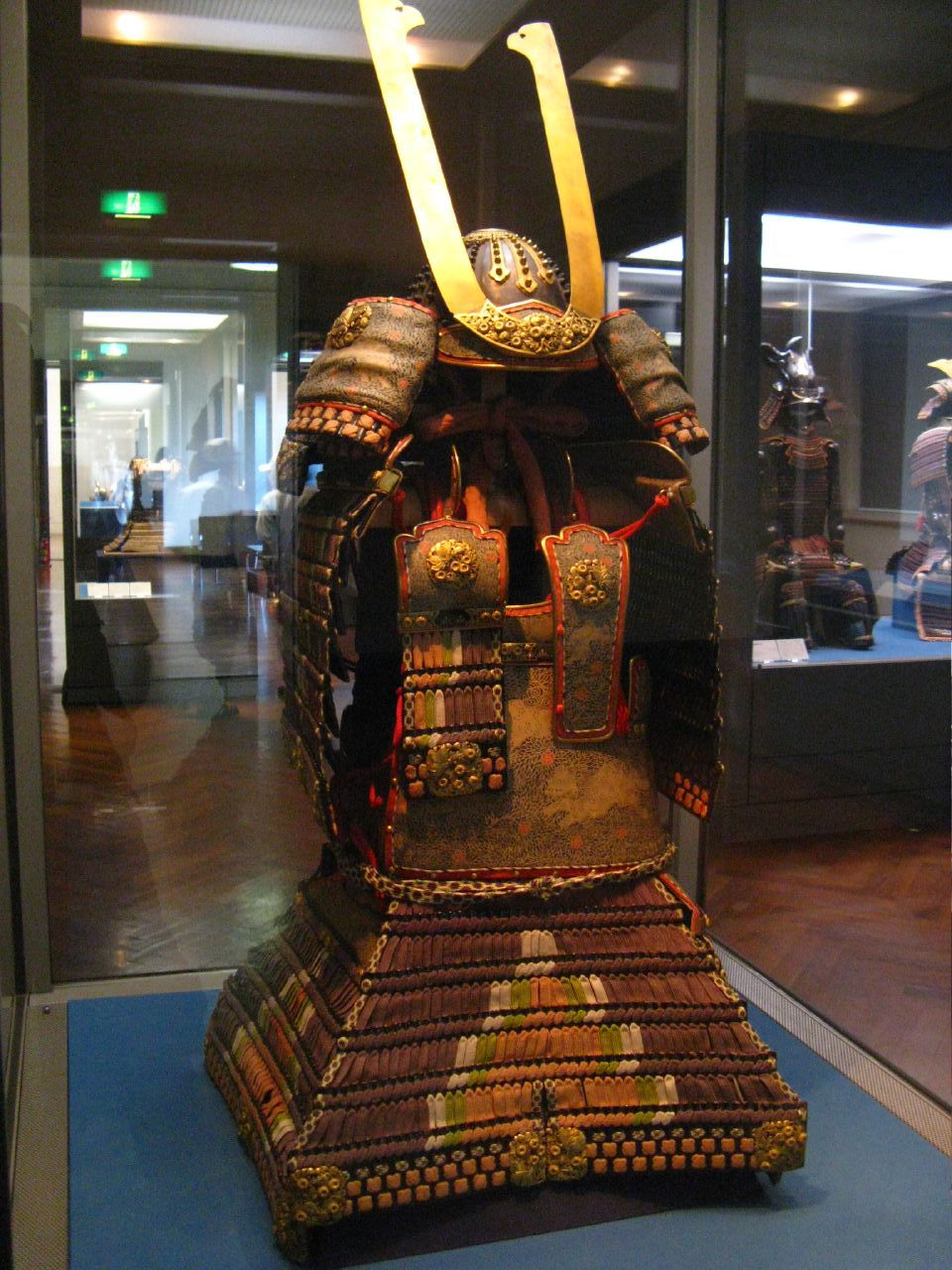
Ō-yoroi, Edo period, 16th century

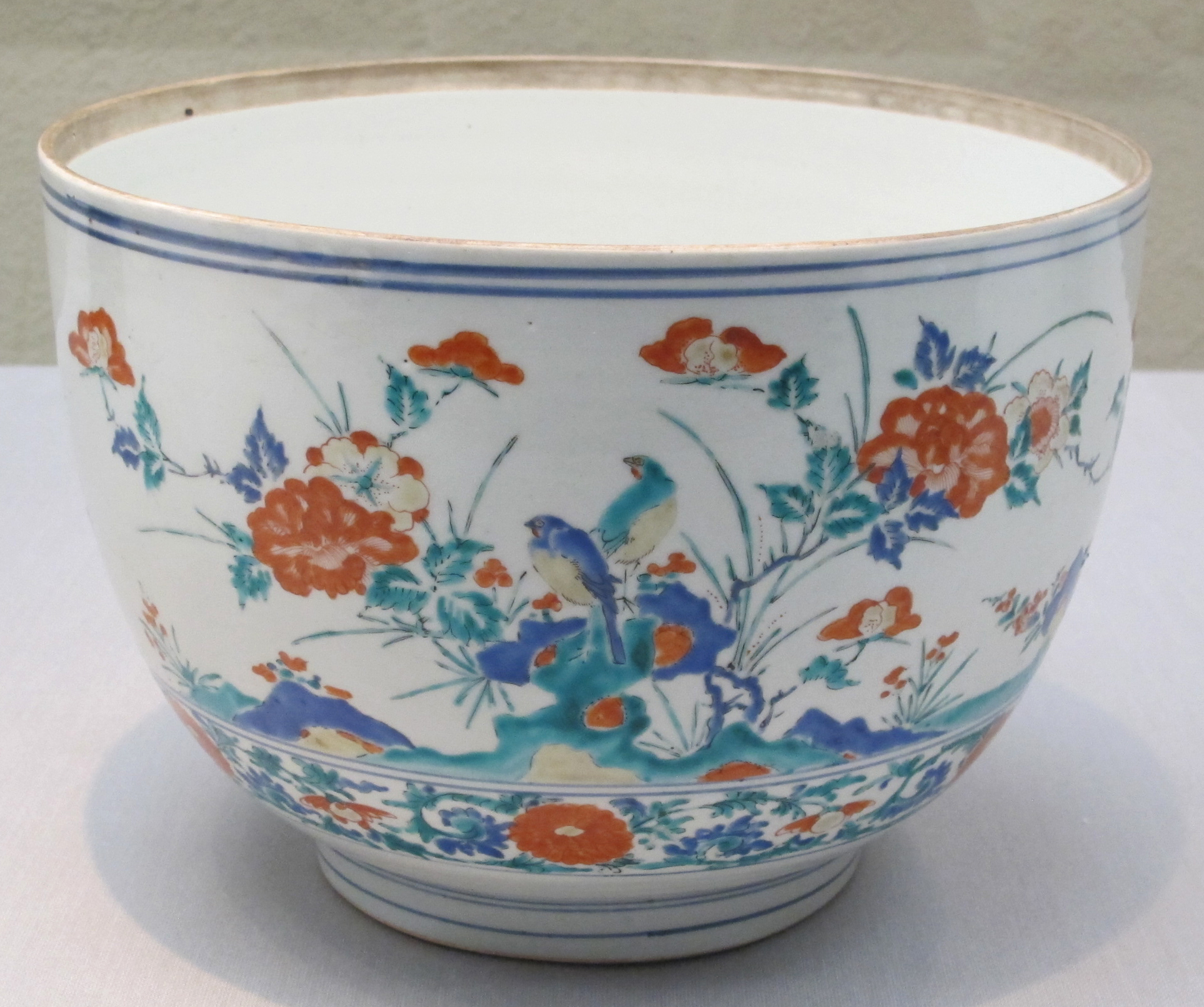
Kakiemon, Edo period, 17th century

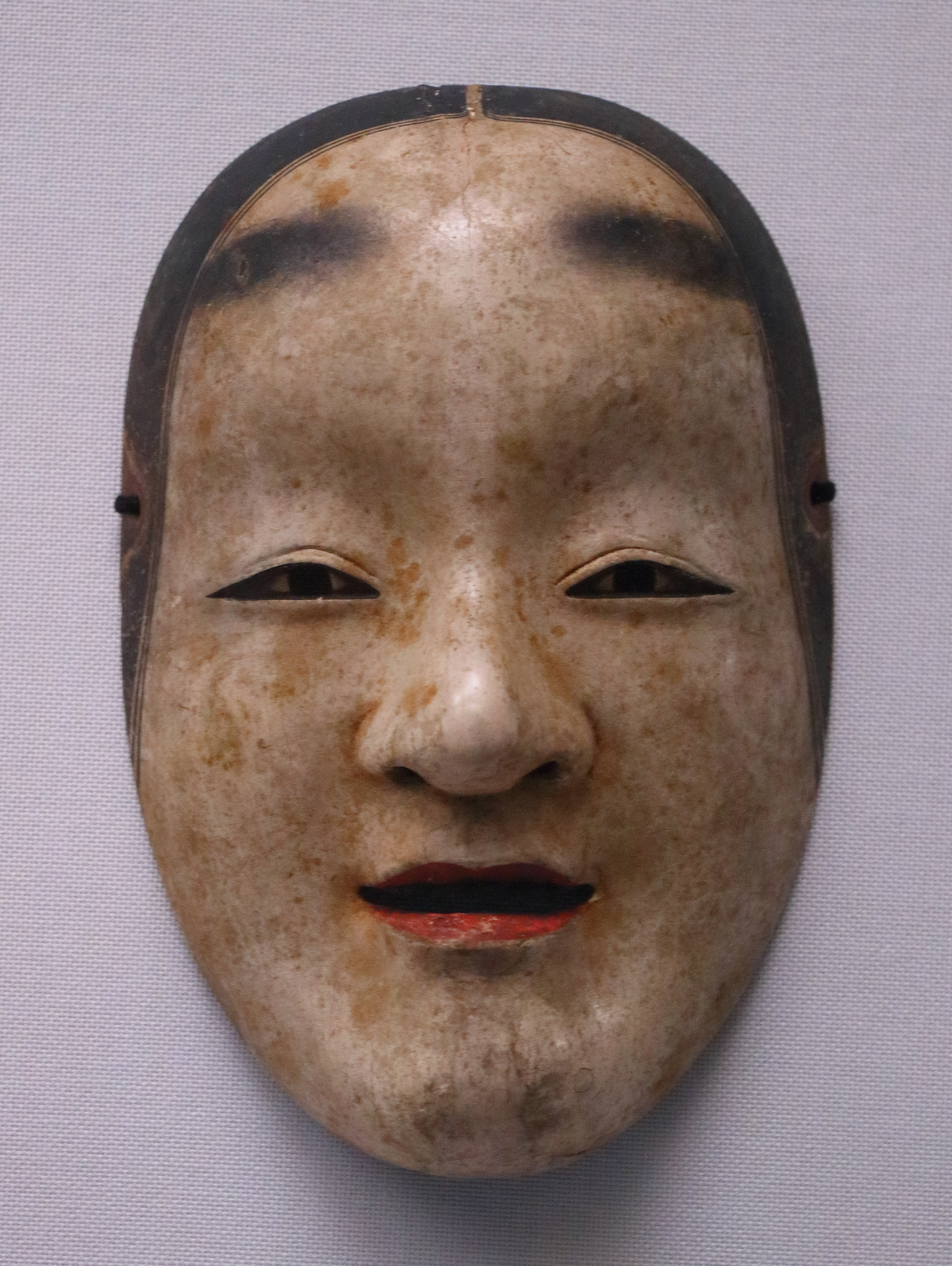
Noh mask from the Konparu school, Edo period, 18th century

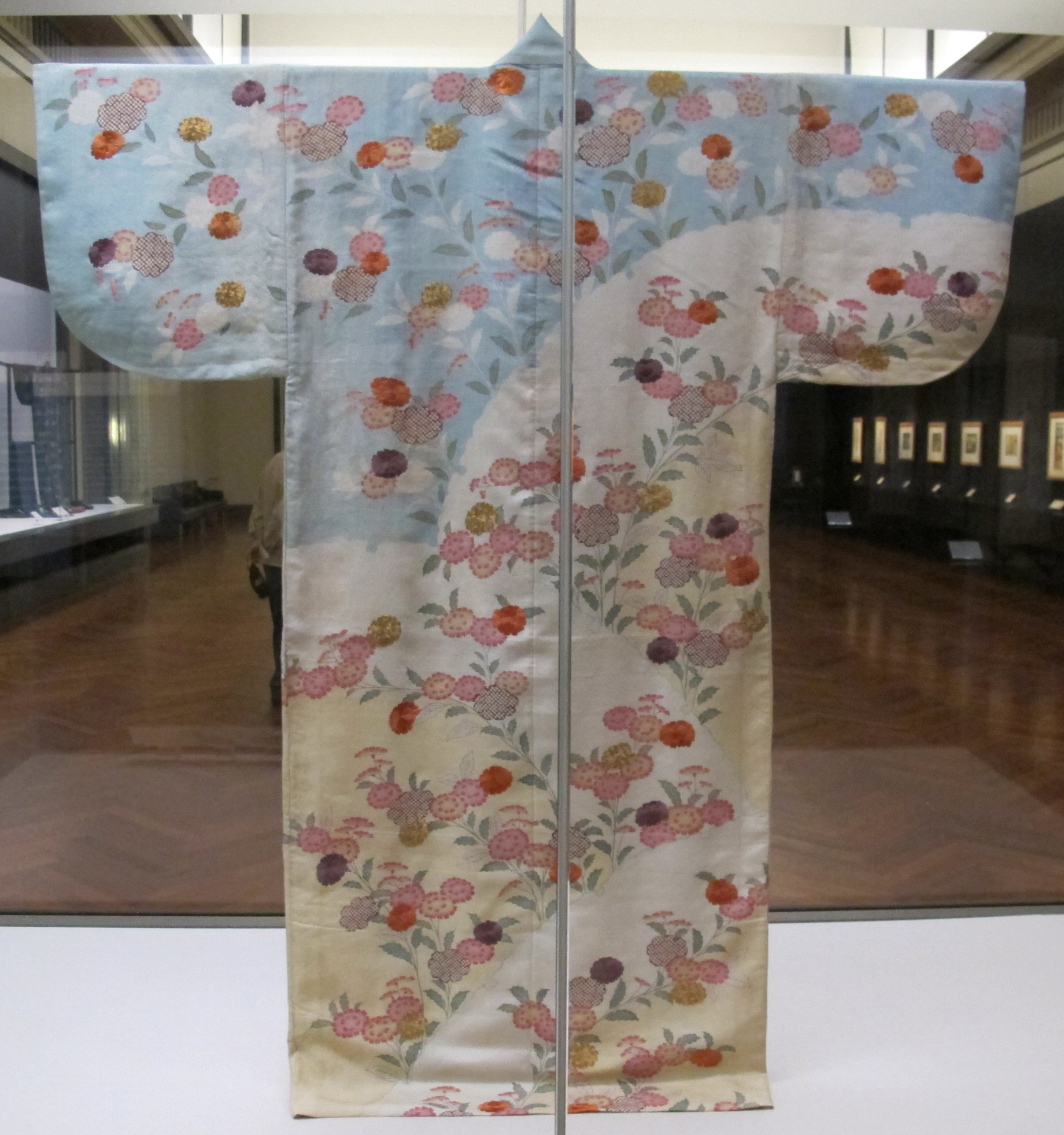
Kosode, Edo period, 18th century

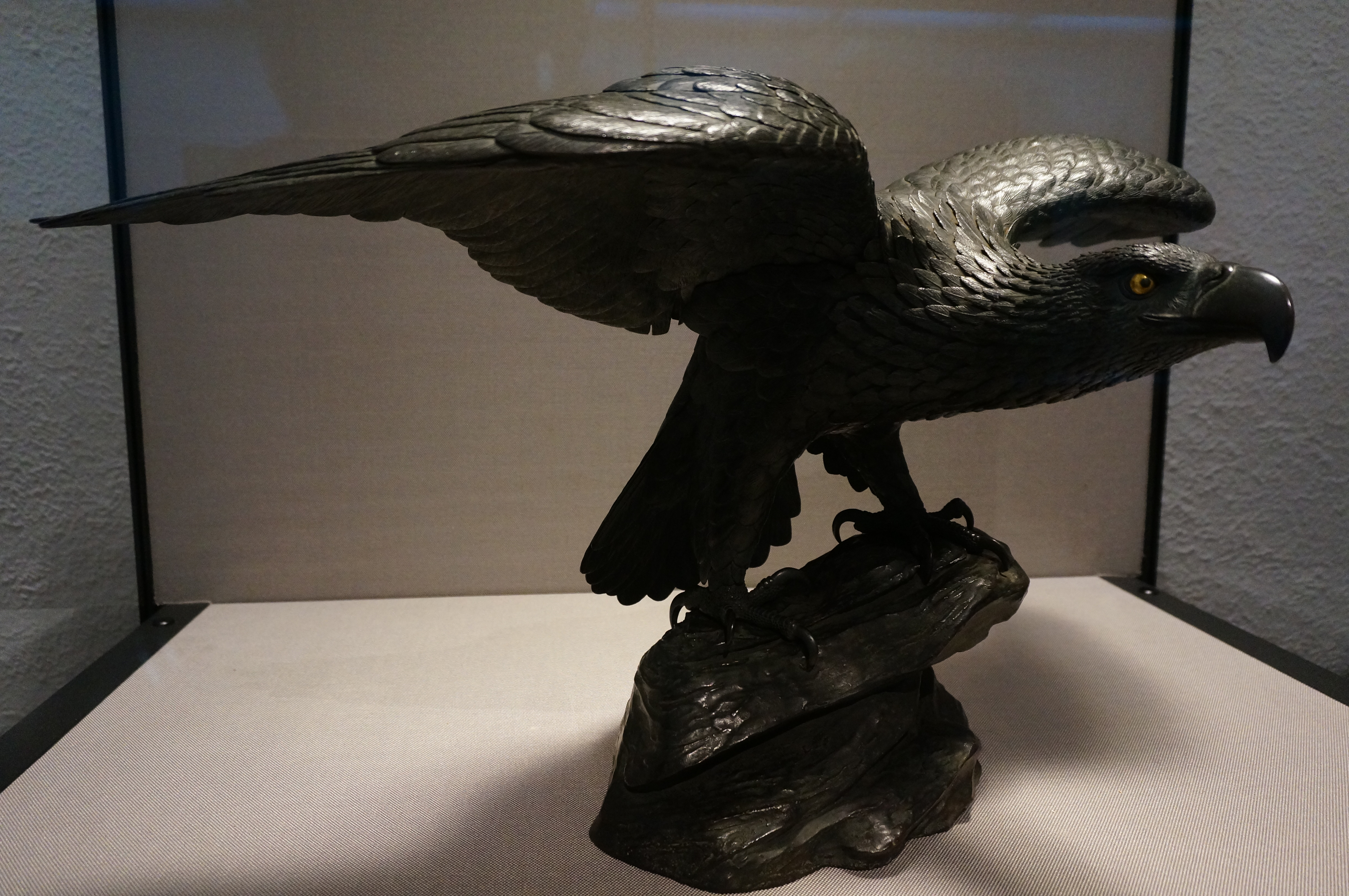
Eagle by Suzuki Chokichi, 1892

=== Heiseikan ===
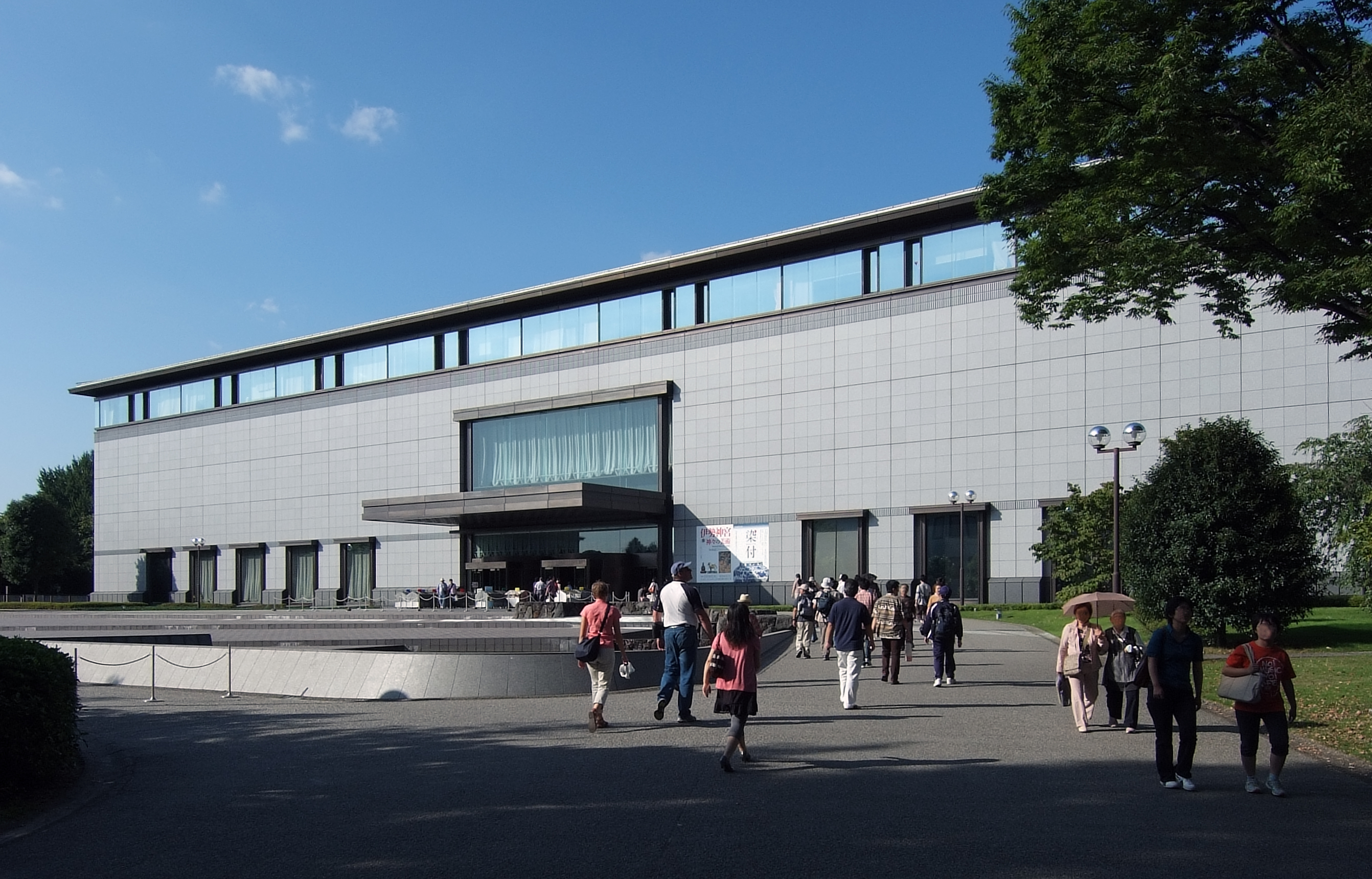
The Heiseikan (2009)

The Heiseikan (平成館, Heisei Gallery) hosts regular special exhibitions in the four large galleries on its second floor; the first floor includes the Japanese Archaeology Gallery, another space for temporary exhibits, a spacious lounge and café, an auditorium, and lecture and orientation rooms. The first floor also holds the gallery of major donors to the museum.

The Heiseikan was first opened in 1999. Its name reflects the regnal era of its creation, the rule of Emperor Akihito, which lasted from 1989 to 2019. The building was erected to commemorate the wedding of Crown Prince Naruhito to Masako Owada (now Emperor Naruhito and Empress Masako) on 9 June 1993.

The Japanese Archaeology Gallery introduces the use of archaeology to date excavated objects and includes a display of various finds from Japanese sites, including Jomon linear appliqué pottery, some of the oldest pottery in the world. (Note: Although sometimes called the oldest pottery in the world, the Japanese finds have been superseded by newer discoveries in China with the objects found in Xianren Cave, Jiangxi, in 2012 the oldest known as of 2019.)

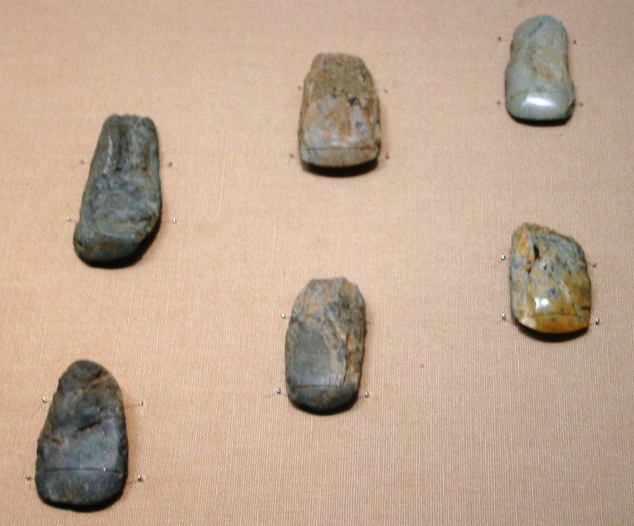
The earliest polished stone tools in the world. Pre-Jōmon (Japanese Paleolithic) period, 30,000 BCE.

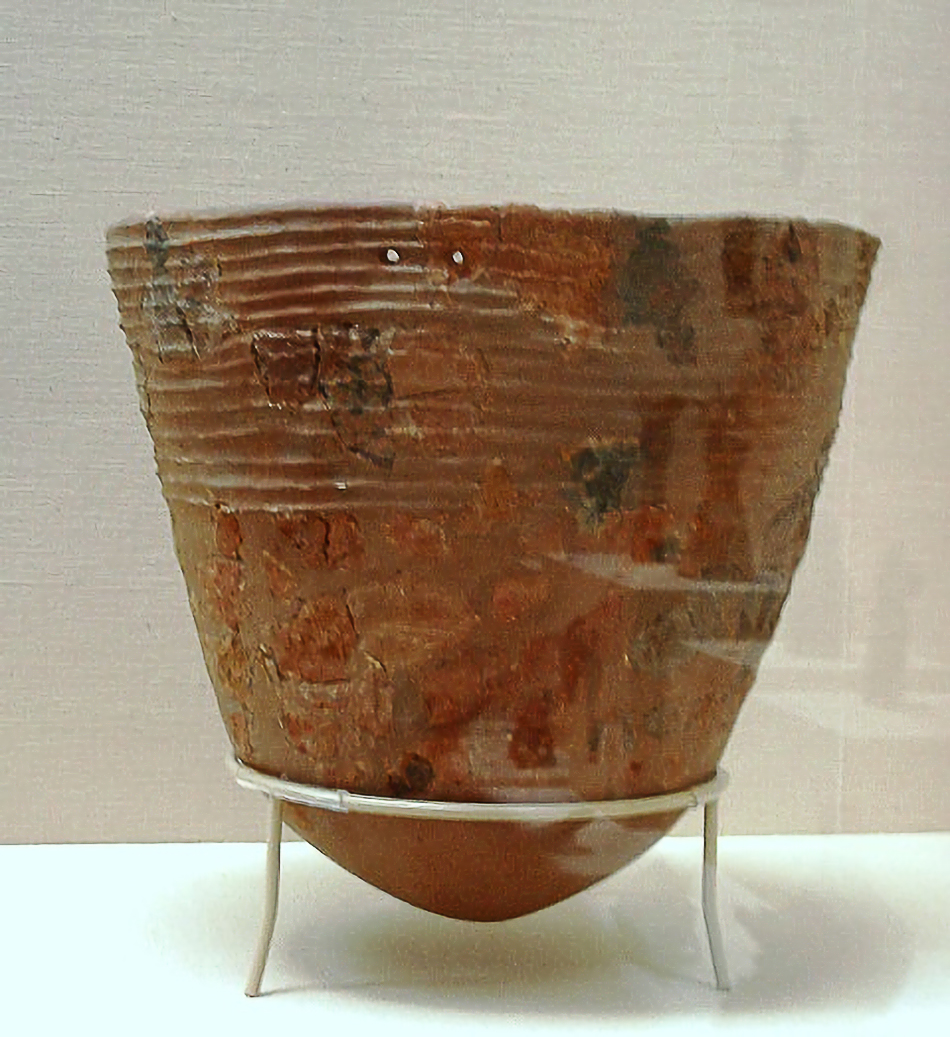
Incipient Jōmon pottery (radiocarbon dated to 12500 ±350 BP)

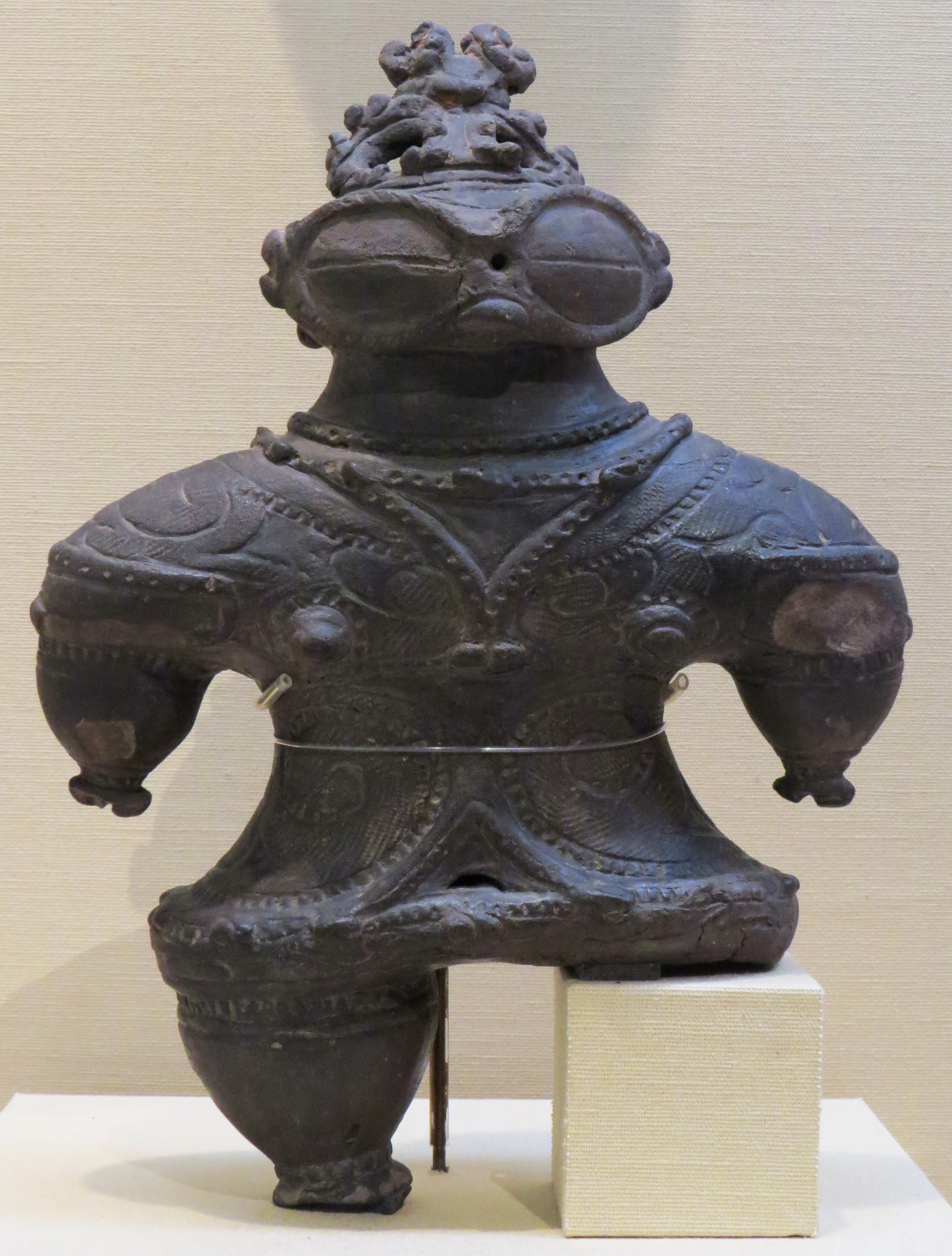
A Final Jōmon statuette (1000–400 BCE)

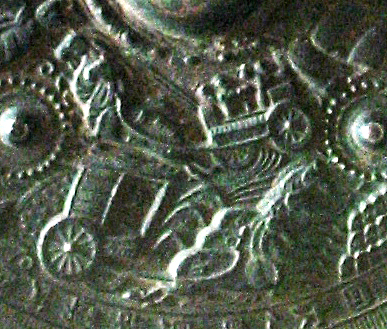
Horse chariots during the Kofun period. Detail of bronze mirror (5th–6th century). Eta-Funayama Tumulus, Kumamoto.

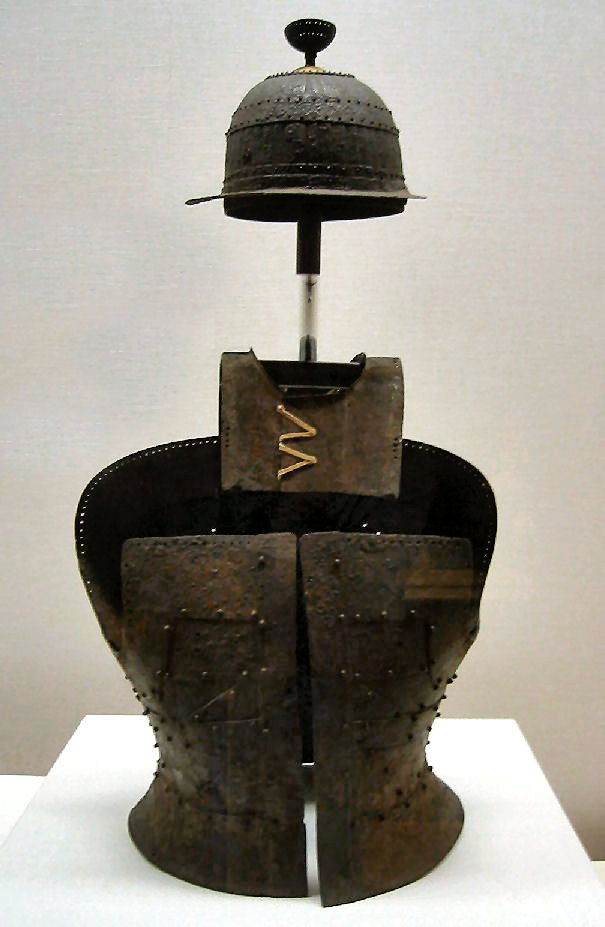
Iron helmet and armour with gilt bronze decoration, Kofun period, 5th century

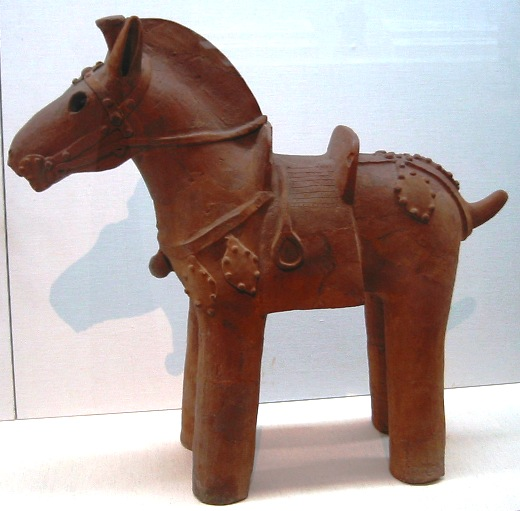
Haniwa horse statuette, complete with saddle and stirrups, 6th century, Japan

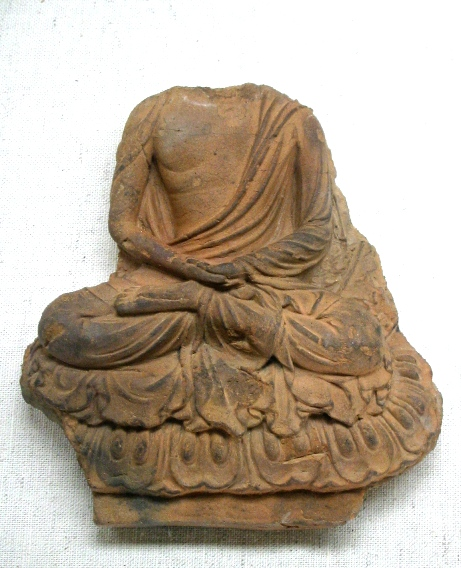
The Buddha, Asuka period, 7th century

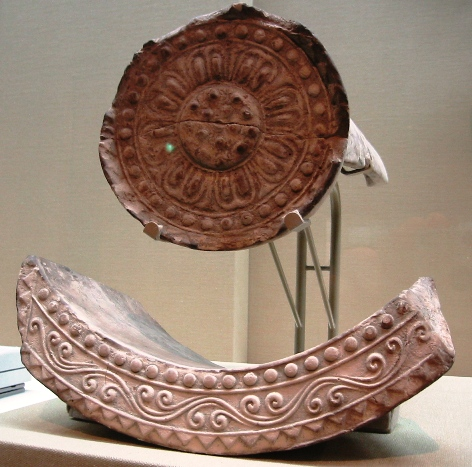
Temple tiles from Nara, 7th century

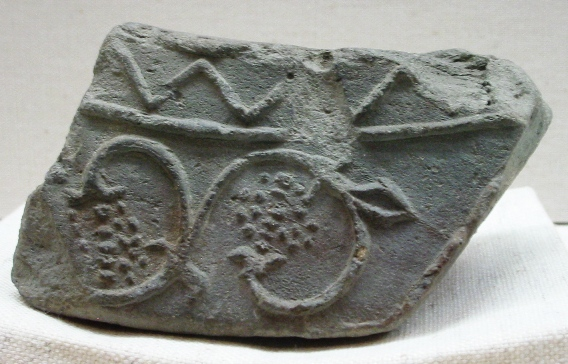
Vine and grape scrolls from Nara, 7th century

=== Toyokan (Asian Gallery) ===
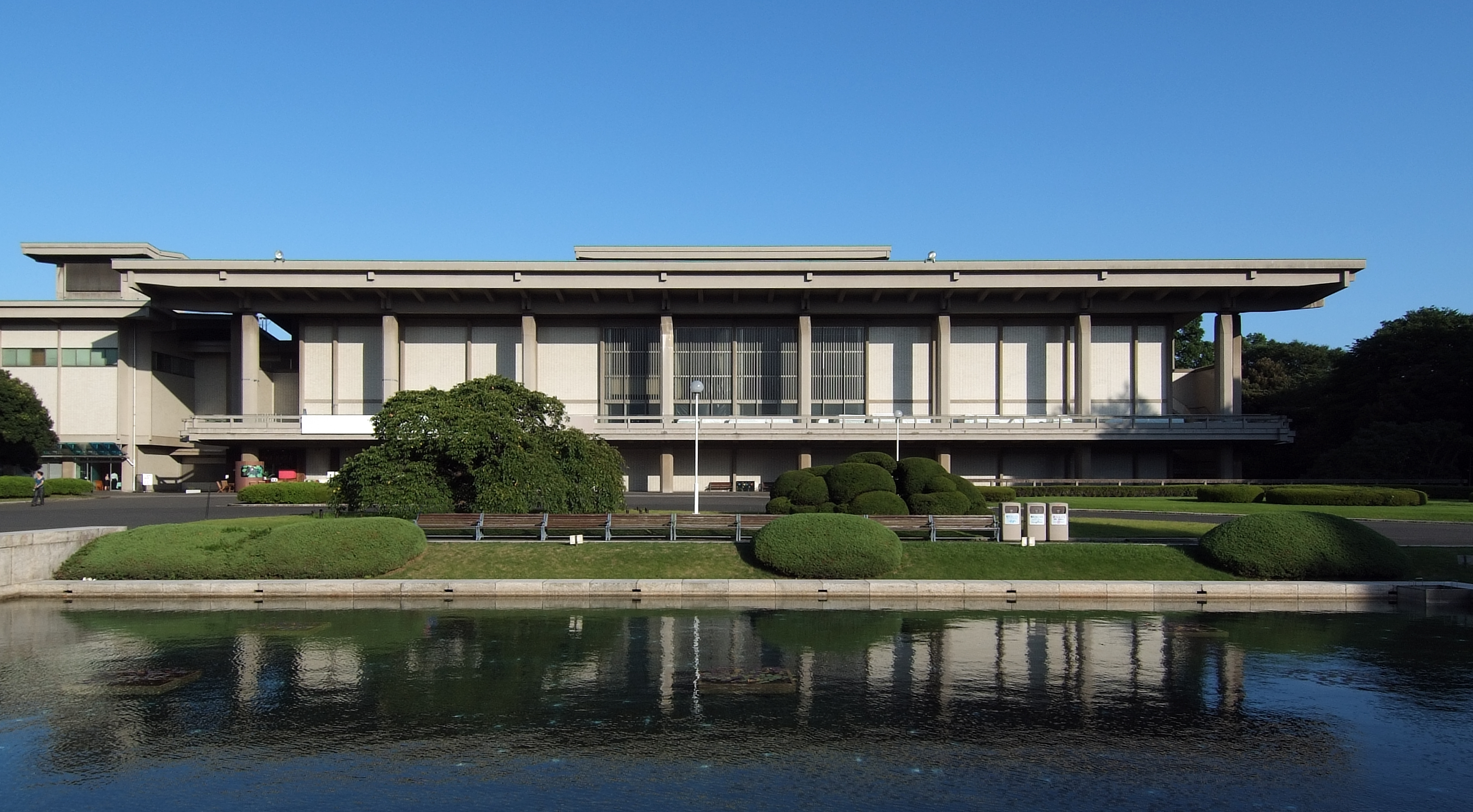
The Toyokan (2009)

The Tōyōkan (東洋館, Eastern Sea or Asian Gallery) displays the museum's collections of Chinese, Korean, Indian, and Southeast and Central Asian art. It also includes a display of Egyptian objects. There is a theater in its basement and a dinner to its side.

The Toyokan was designed by Yoshirō Taniguchi, opened in 1968, refurbished in the early 2010s, and reopened in January 2013. It is three stories tall but employs its basement and a spiral arrangement of mezzanines and stairs to spread its collection over six floors.

| Floor | Room | Name |
|---|---|---|
| B1 | 11 | Khmer Sculpture |
| B1 | 12 | Gilt Bronze Statues from Southeast Asia; Archaeology of India and Southeast Asia; Southeast Asian Ceramics |
| B1 | 13 | Asian Textiles; Indian Miniature Paintings; Ethnic Cultures of Asia |
| 1 | 1 | Chinese Buddhist Sculpture |
| 2 | 2 | Oasis2 Education Space |
| 2 | 3 | Sculptures from India and Gandhara; Art of the Western Regions; Artifacts from West Asia and Egypt |
| 3 | 4 | The Advent of Chinese Civilization |
| 3 | 5 | Chinese Bronzes; Burials in China; Chinese Ceramics; Chinese Textiles |
| 3 | 6 | Oasis6 Education Space |
| 4 | 7 | Stone Relief Carvings of China |
| 4 | 8 | Chinese Painting; Chinese Calligraphy; Chinese Literati |
| 5 | 9 | Chinese Lacquerware; Decorative Art of the Qing Dynasty |
| 5 | 10 | Polished Stone Tools and Metal Tools of Korea; The Rises and Falls of Kings in Korea; Korean Ceramics; Buddhist Art of Korea; Art of the Joseon Dynasty |

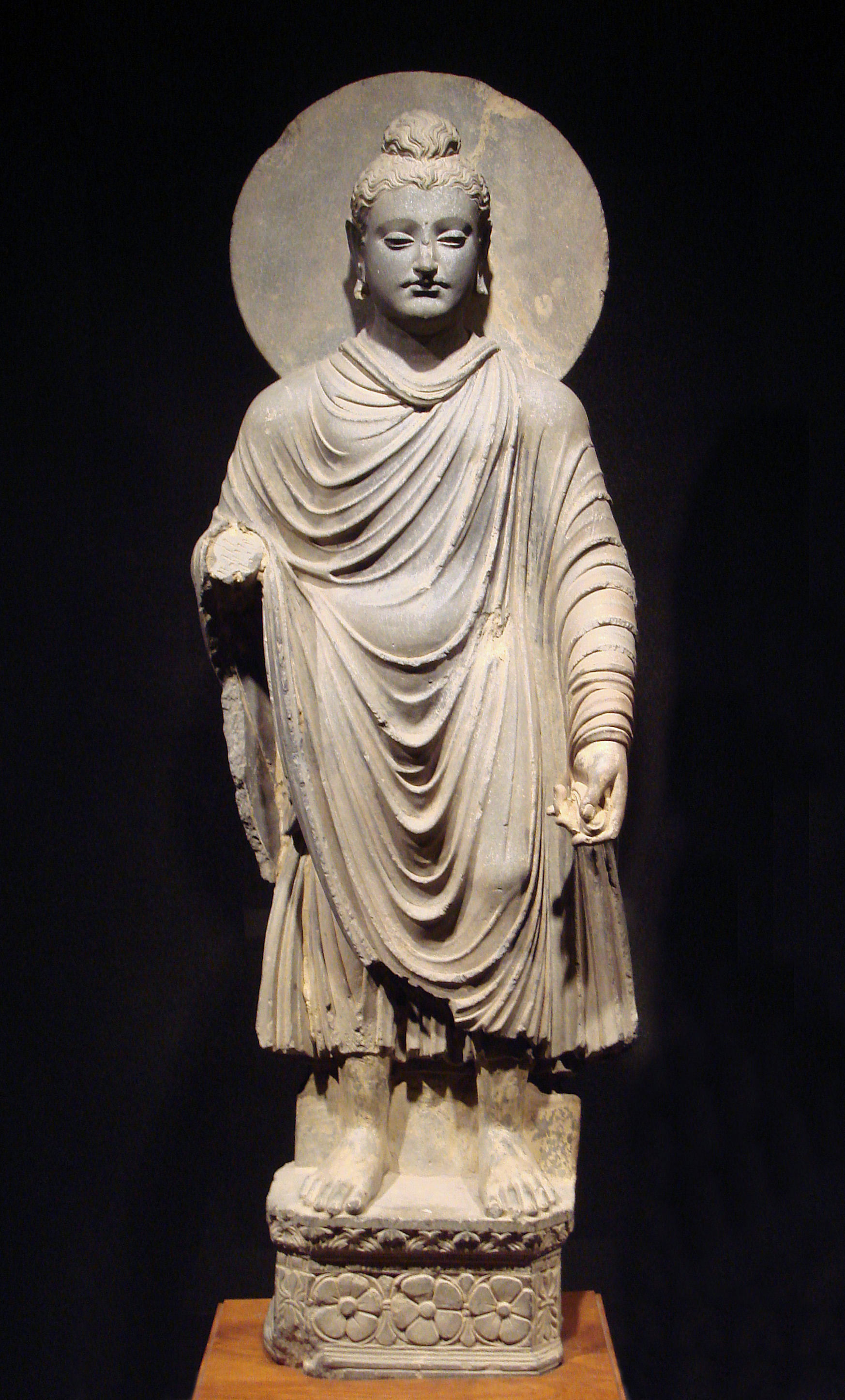
One of the first representations of the Buddha, 1st–2nd century CE, Gandhara from Pakistan

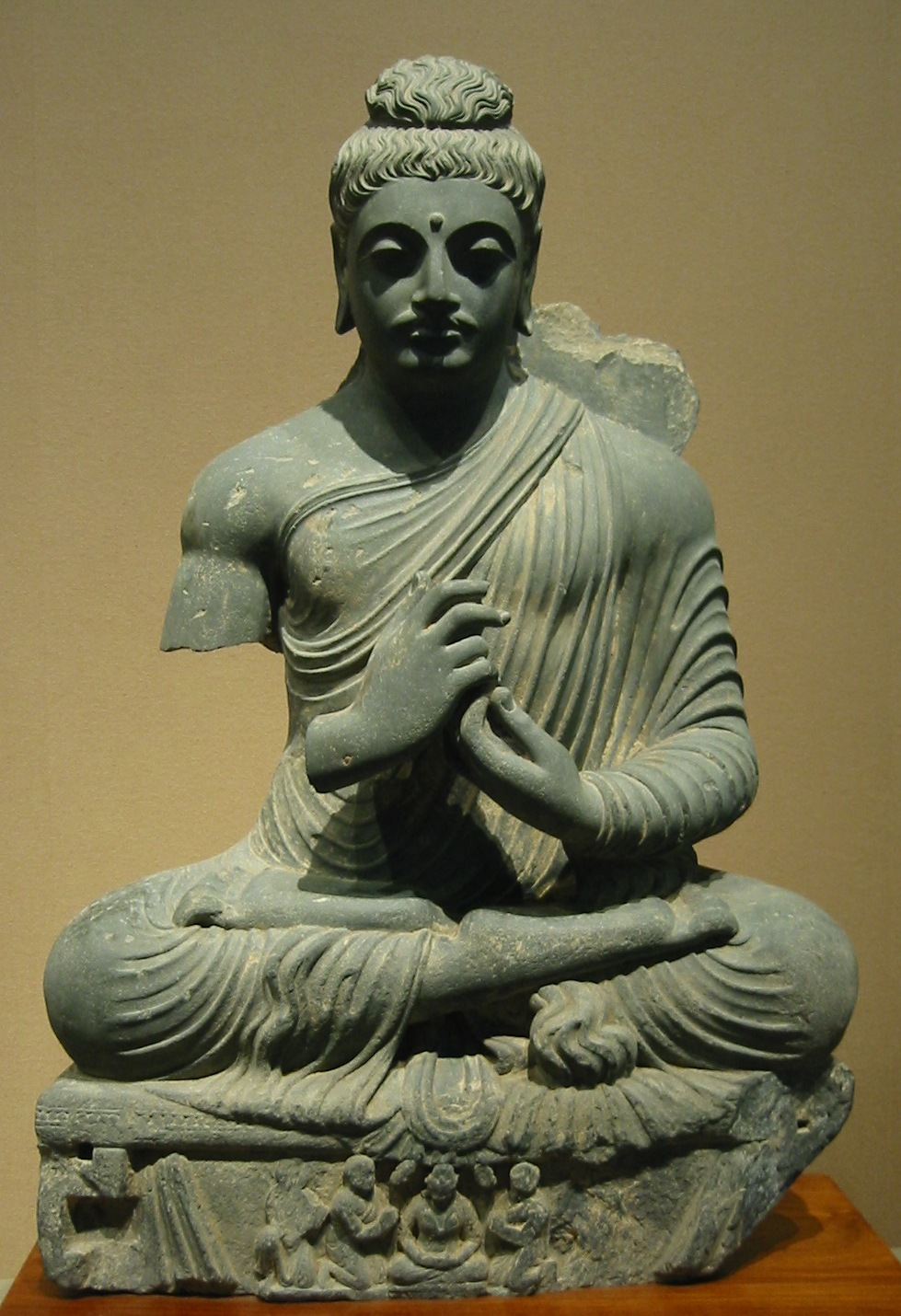
Seated Buddha, Gandhara, 1st–2nd century CE

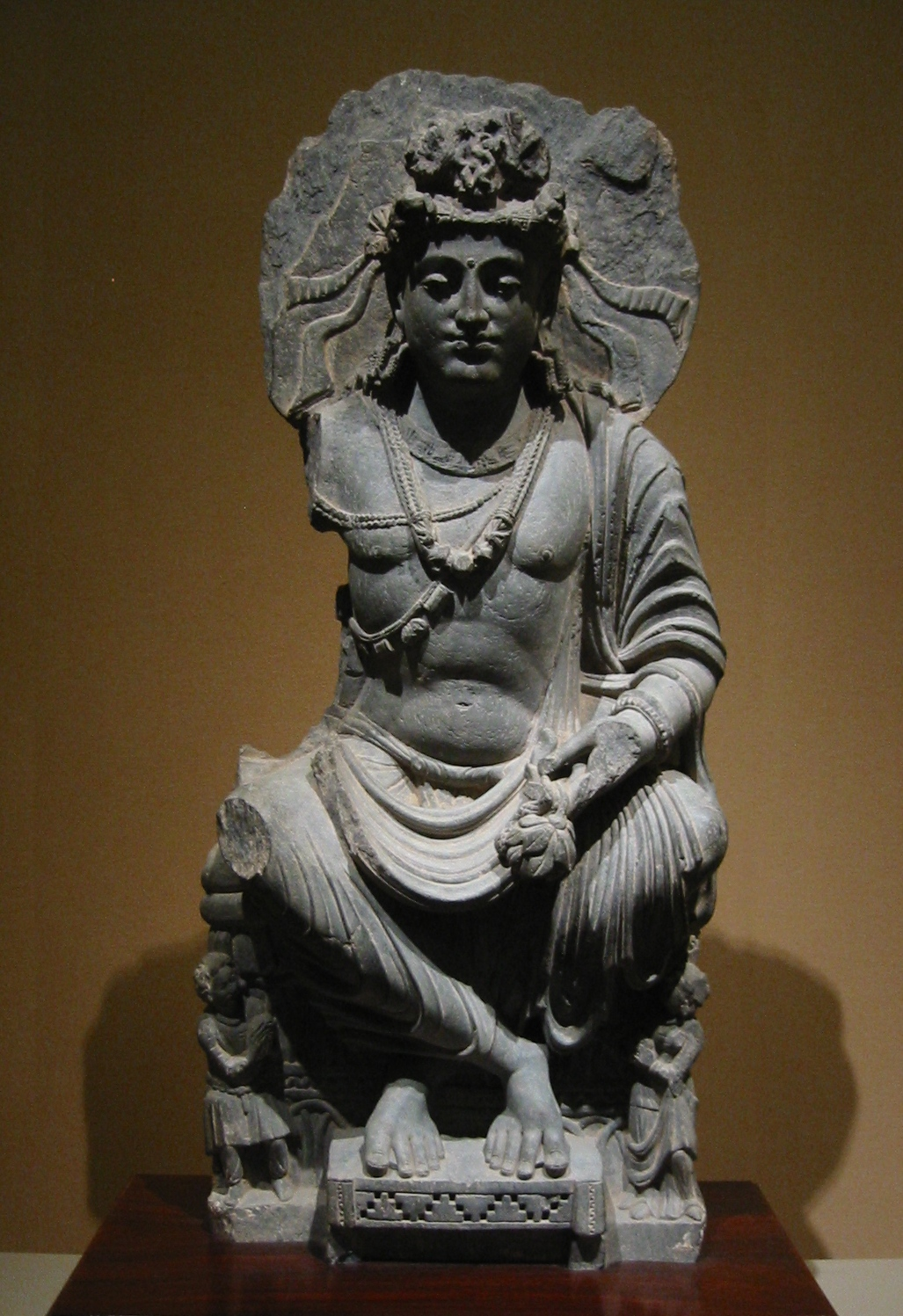
Maitreya, seated on a throne in the Western manner, with Kushan devotee. 2nd century Gandhara.

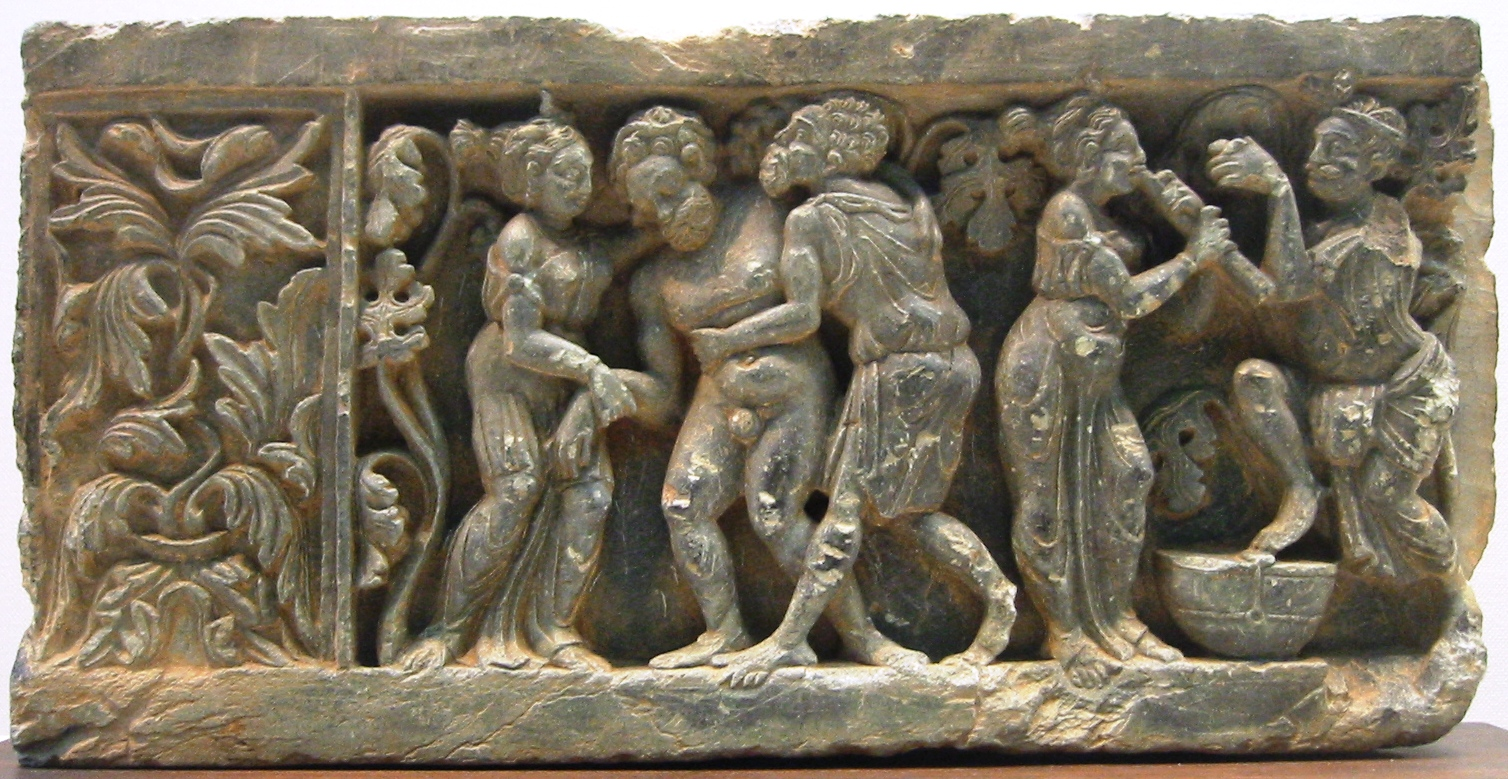
Bacchanalian scene, representing the harvest of wine grapes, Greco-Buddhist art of Gandhara, 1st-2nd century CE

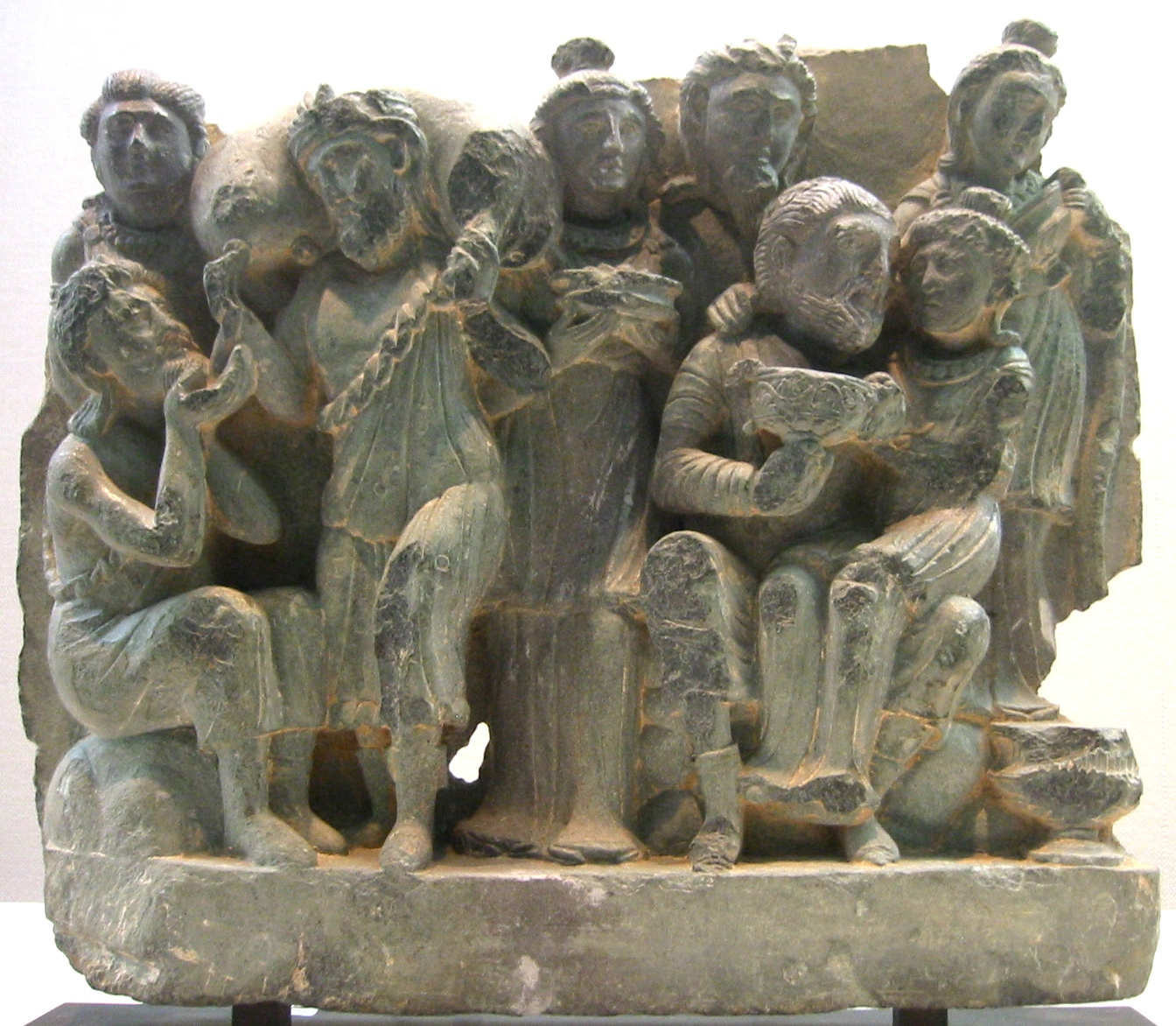
Drinking scene, Greek drinking cups, Greek dress. Greco-Buddhist art of Gandhara. 3rd century CE.

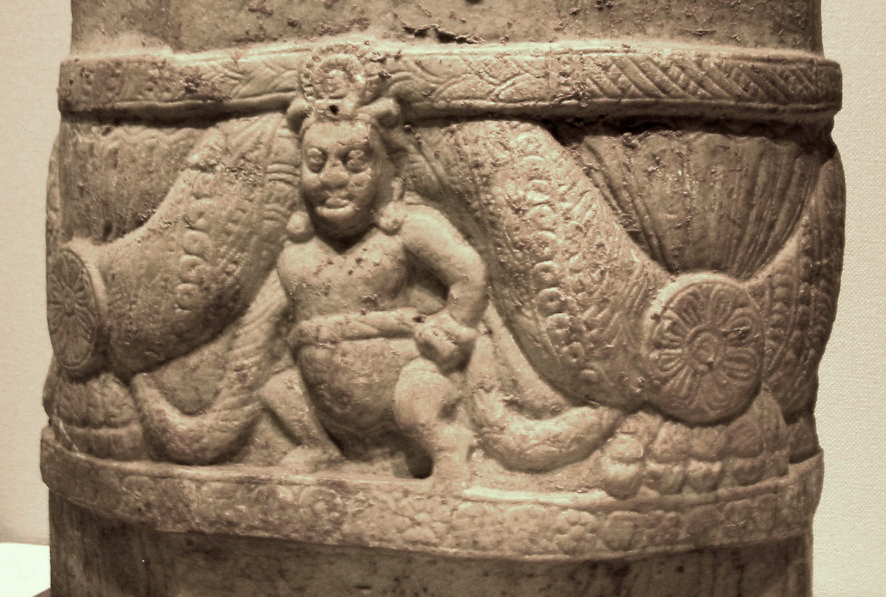
Greek scroll supported by Indian Yaksas, Amaravati Stupa, 3rd century

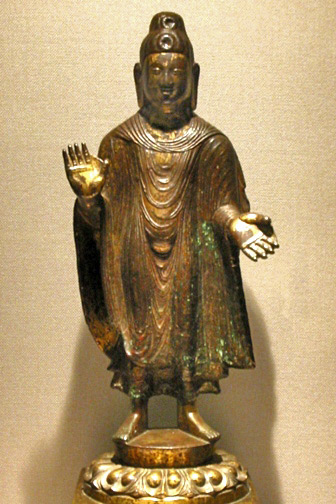
Northern Wei Buddha Maitreya, 443

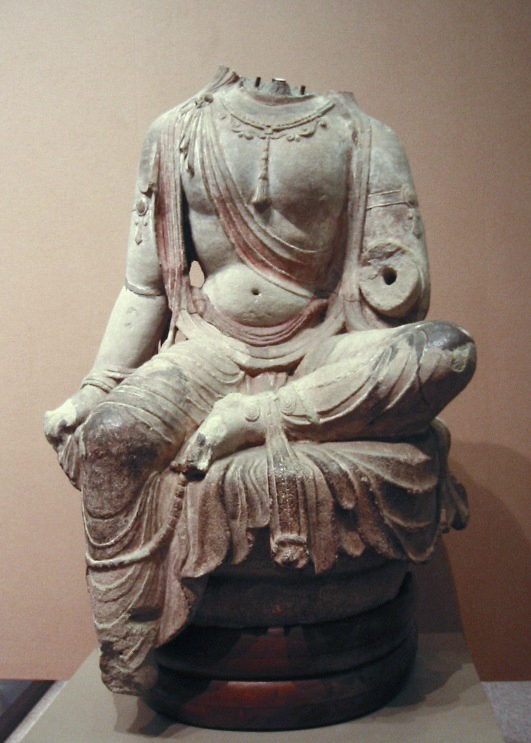
Tang-dynasty Bodhisattva

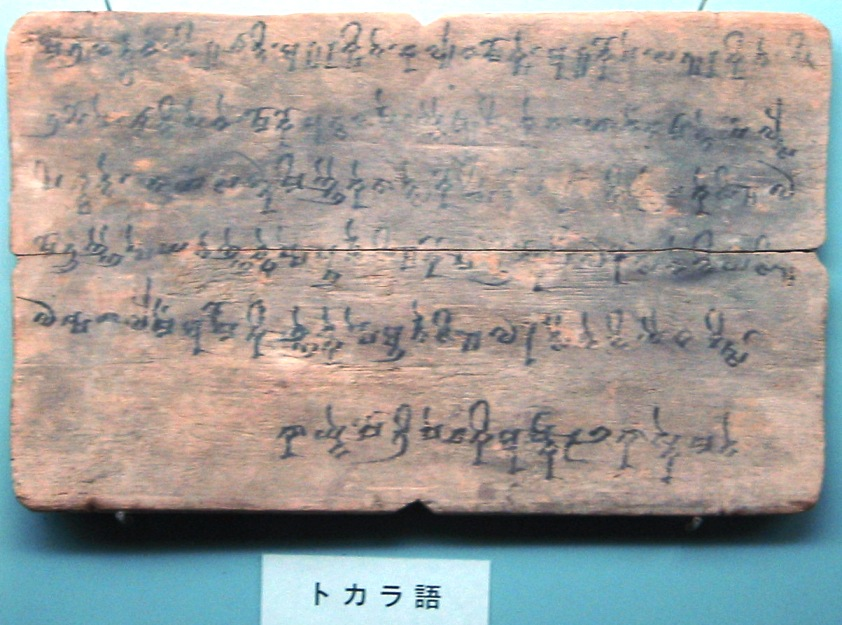
Wooden plate with inscriptions in Tocharian. Kucha, China, 5th–8th century.

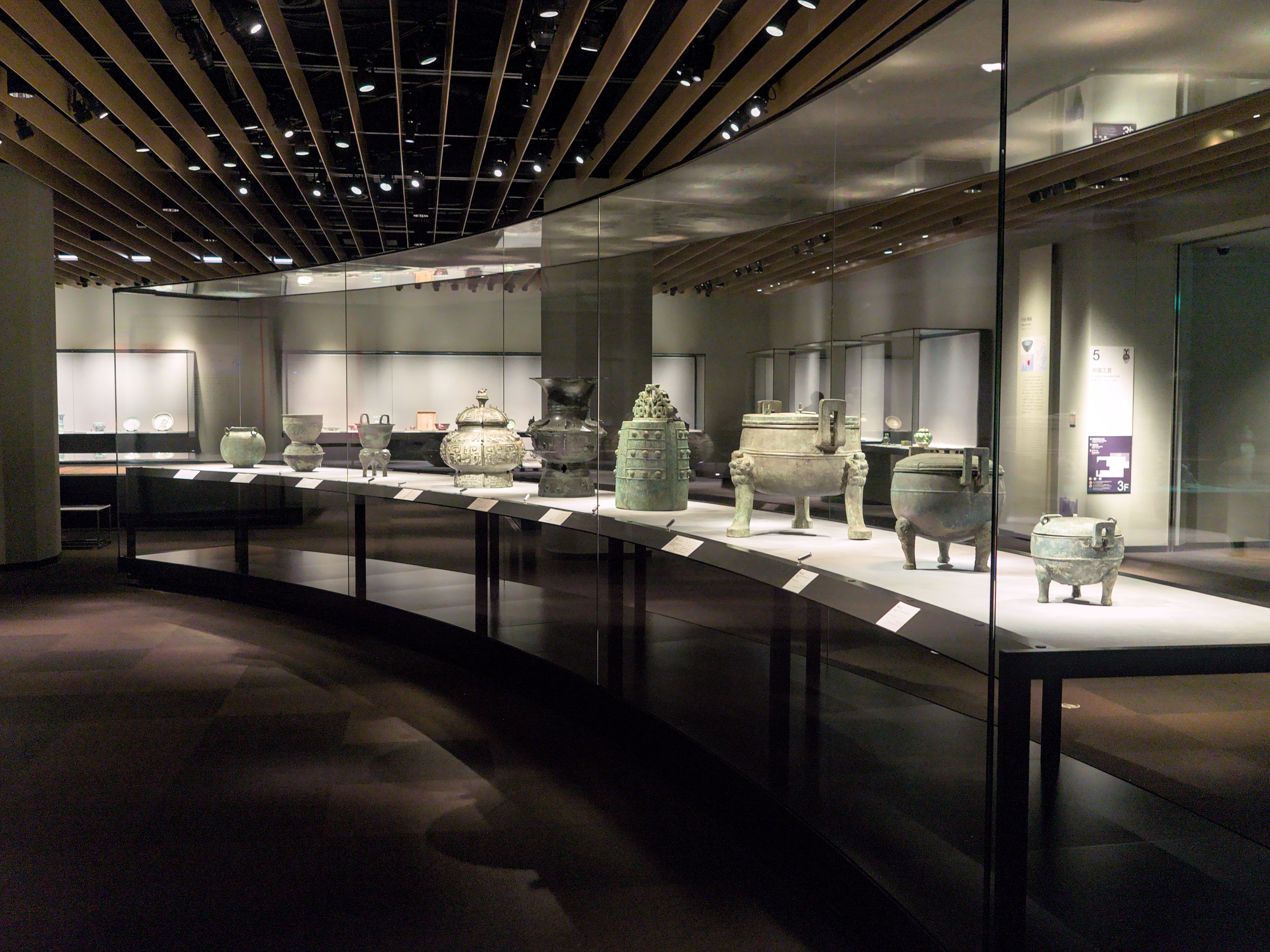
The Toyokan's collection of Chinese bronzeware

=== Horyuji Homotsukan (Gallery of Horyuji Treasures) ===
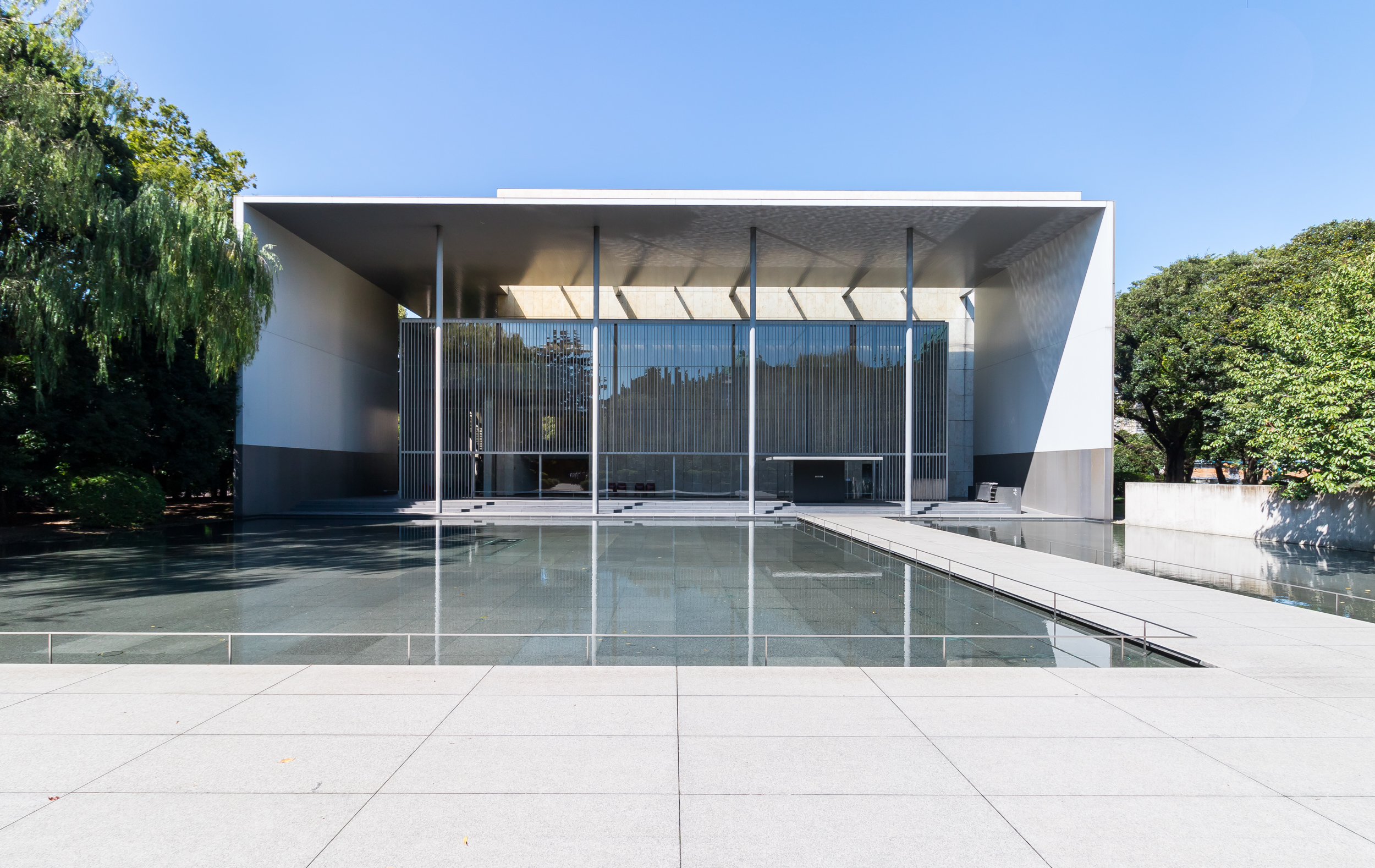
The Gallery of Horyuji Treasures (2018)

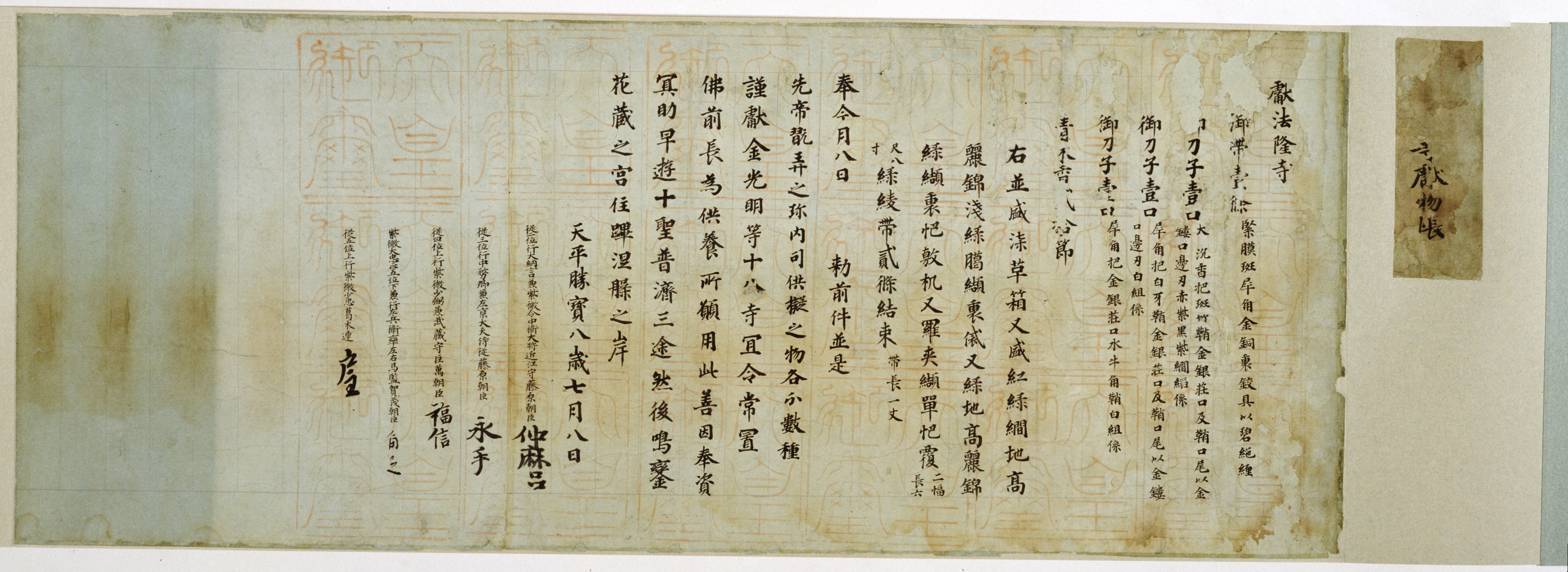
A scroll from 8 July 756, recording Empress Koken's gifts to Horyu Temple

The Hōryū-ji Hōmotsukan (法隆寺宝物館, Gallery of Horyuji Treasures) is a two-story building housing the museum's collection of relics from the Horyu Temple in Nara. The 319 items were given to the Imperial Household by the temple in 1878, then placed at the National Museum for safekeeping and preservation.

The building was designed by Yoshio Taniguchi and opened in 1999.

| Floor | Room | Name |
|---|---|---|
| 1 | 1 | Banner for the Kanjo Ceremony |
| 1 | 2 | Gilt Bronze Buddhist Statues, Halos, Repoussé Buddhist Images |
| 1 | 3 | Gigaku Masks |
| 2 | 4 | Wooden and Lacquer Works |
| 2 | 5 | Metalwork |
| 2 | 6 | Painting, Calligraphy, and Textiles |

A mezzanine between the two floors holds a Reference Room with a digital archive of the treasures, allowing visitors to view the entire collection with explanations in Japanese, Korean, Chinese, English, French, and German. There is a restaurant on the first floor.

=== Hyokeikan ===
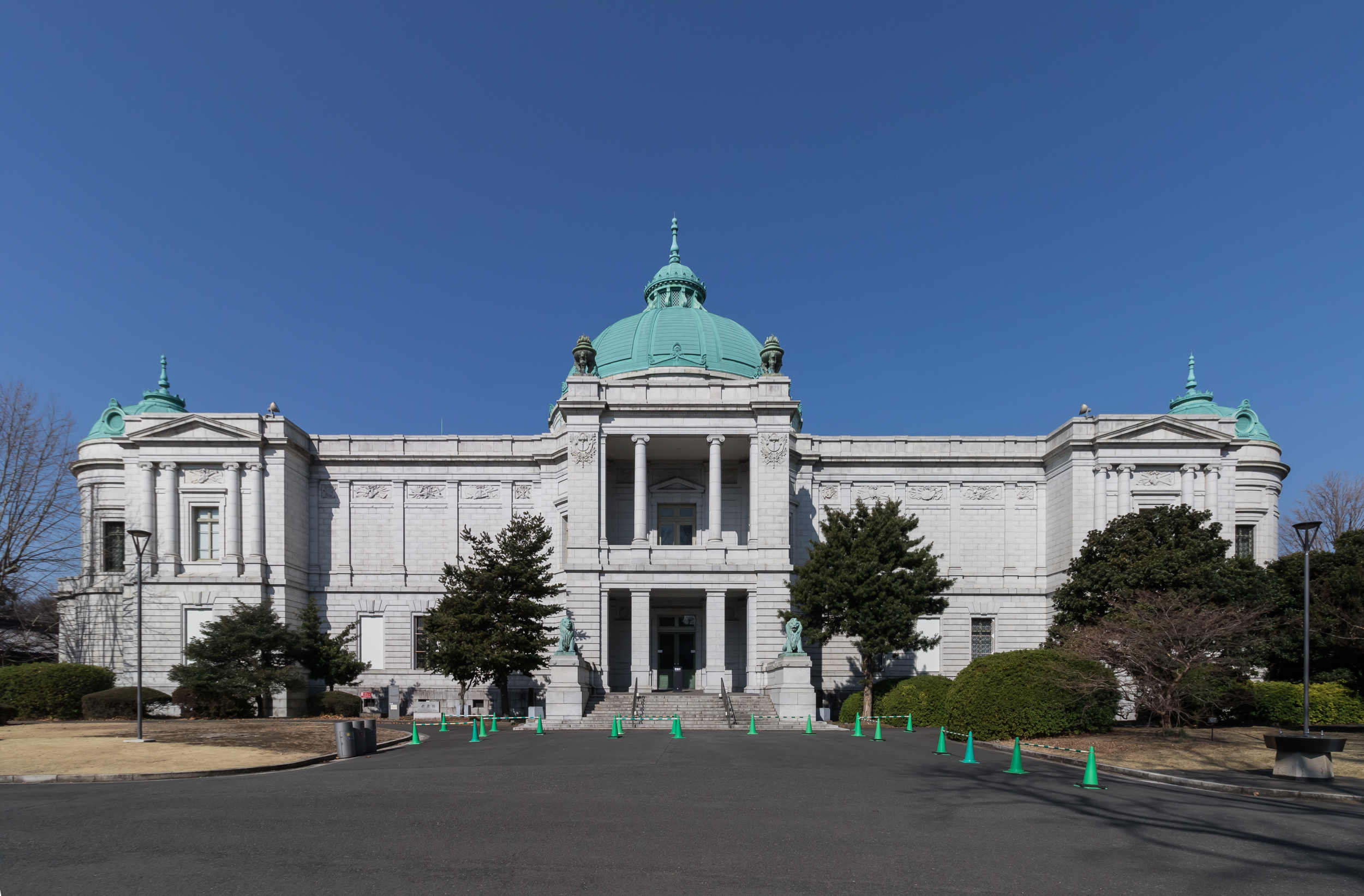
The Hyokeikan (2019)

The Hyōkeikan (表慶館, Congratulatory Gallery) was opened in 1909. Its name reflects its construction in honor of the wedding of Crown Prince Yoshihito and Sadako Kujo (later Emperor Taisho and Empress Teimei) on 10 May 1900. As an example of the Western-influenced architecture of the late Meiji Era, it was designated an Important Cultural Property in 1978. It is closed to the public except during special exhibitions.

=== Kuroda Kinenkan (Kuroda Memorial Hall) ===
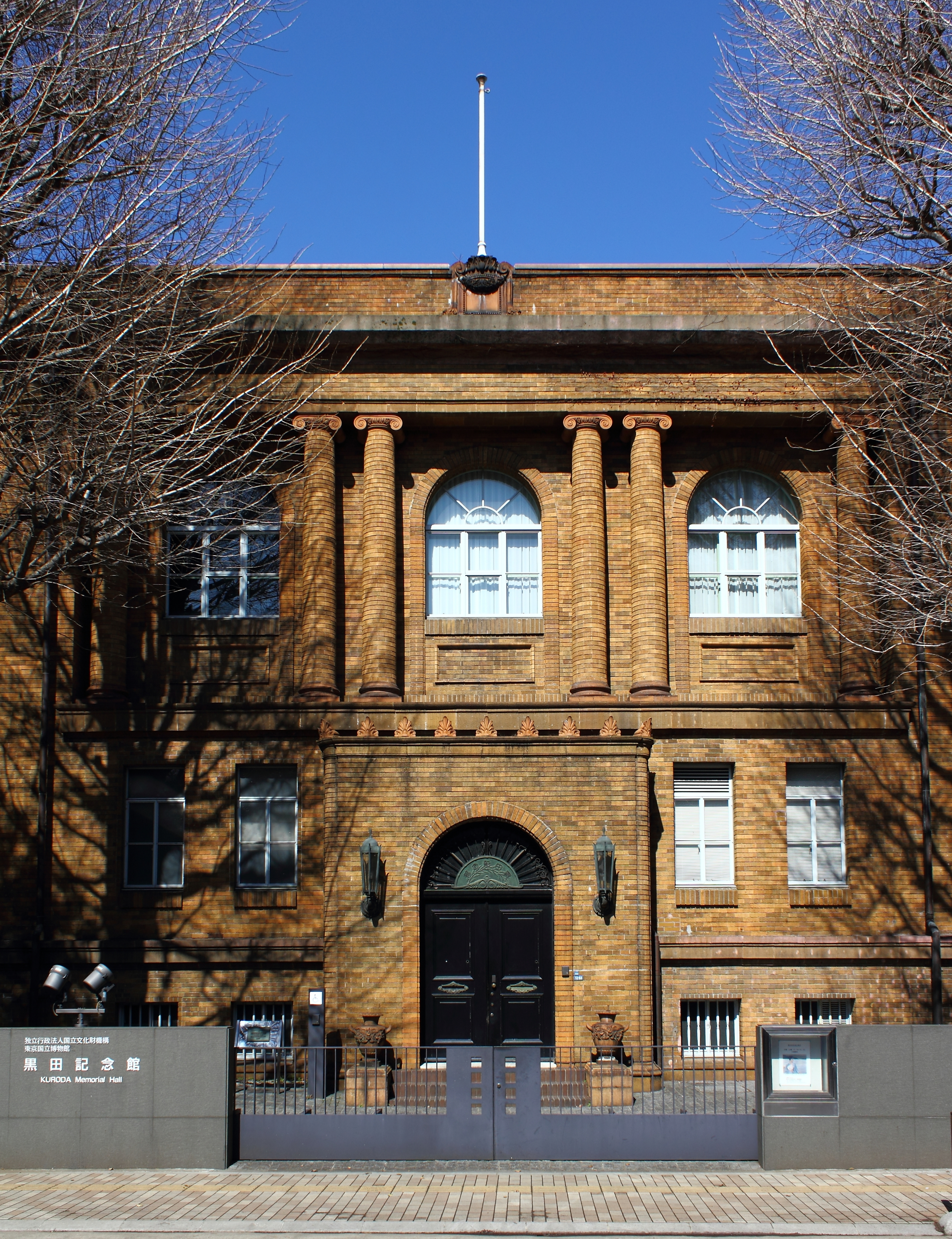
Kuroda Memorial Hall

The Kuroda Memorial Hall (黒田記念館, Kuroda Kinenkan) holds a collection of works by the important Western-style (yōga) artist Kuroda Seiki. Its collection presently comprises 126 oil paintings and 170 drawings, as well as sketchbooks, letters, &c. Located northwest of the main museum compound, it has free admission and separate hours of operation (9:30 AM–5:00 PM, with the last admission at 4:30).

Designed by Okada Shinichirō, the hall was built in 1928 as part of Kuroda's bequest to use part of his fortune "to fund projects to promote art". In 1930, it became the headquarters of the Art Research Institute, which became the Tokyo Research Institute for Cultural Properties. The TRICP moved in 2000, with the Kuroda Memorial Hall reopening as a public gallery the next year. In 2007, its administration was transferred to the Tokyo National Museum, which renovated it before reopening it on 2 January 2015. Admission was originally restricted to two-week periods in January, Spring, and Autumn but it is presently open whenever the main museum is.

The exhibition on the second floor consists of 4 rooms: the Kuroda Memorial Room, the Reading Room, the Audiovisual Room, and the Collection Highlights Gallery. There is also a cafe on the first and second floors.

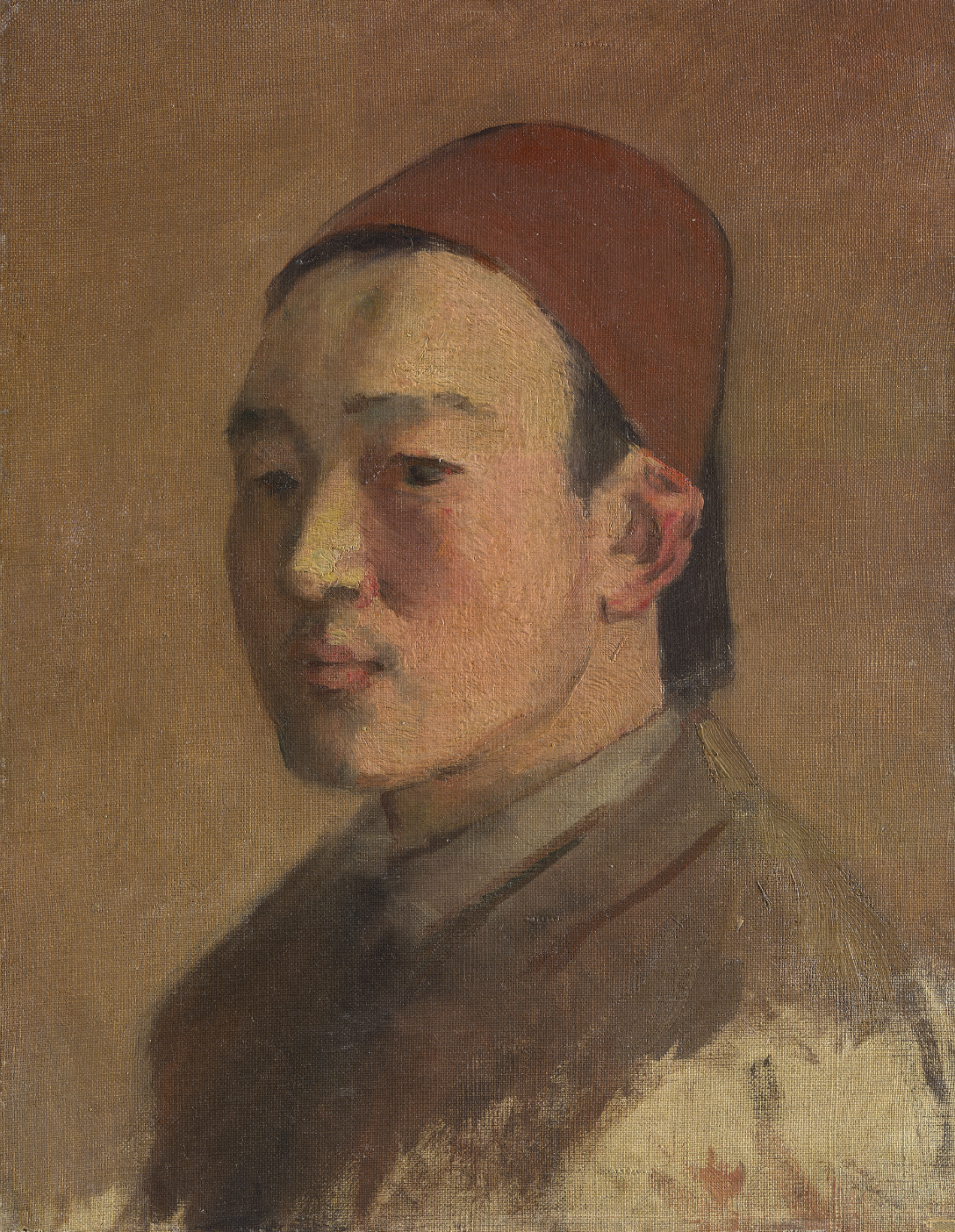
Self-portrait in a Turkish Hat (1889)

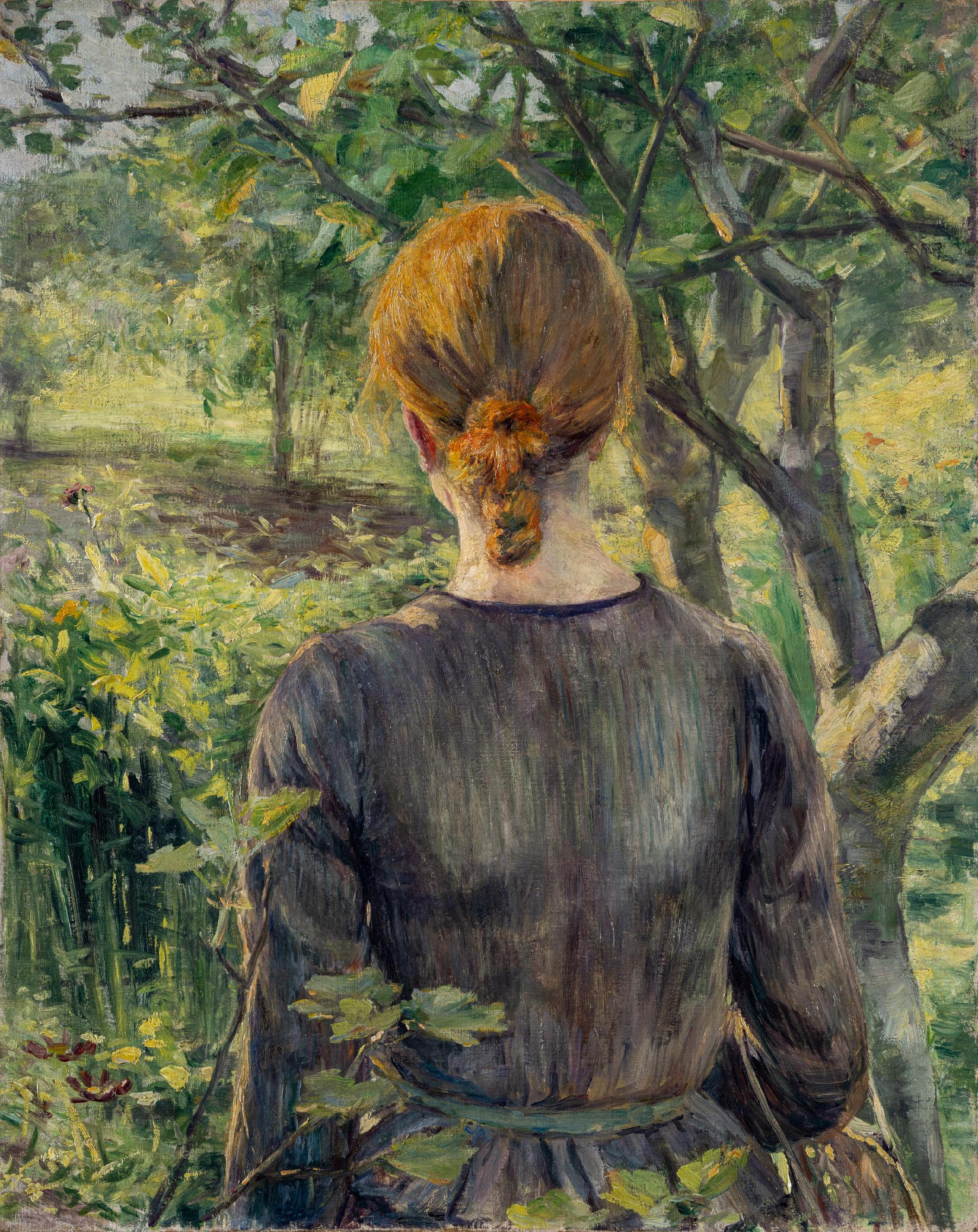
Girl with Red Hair (1892)

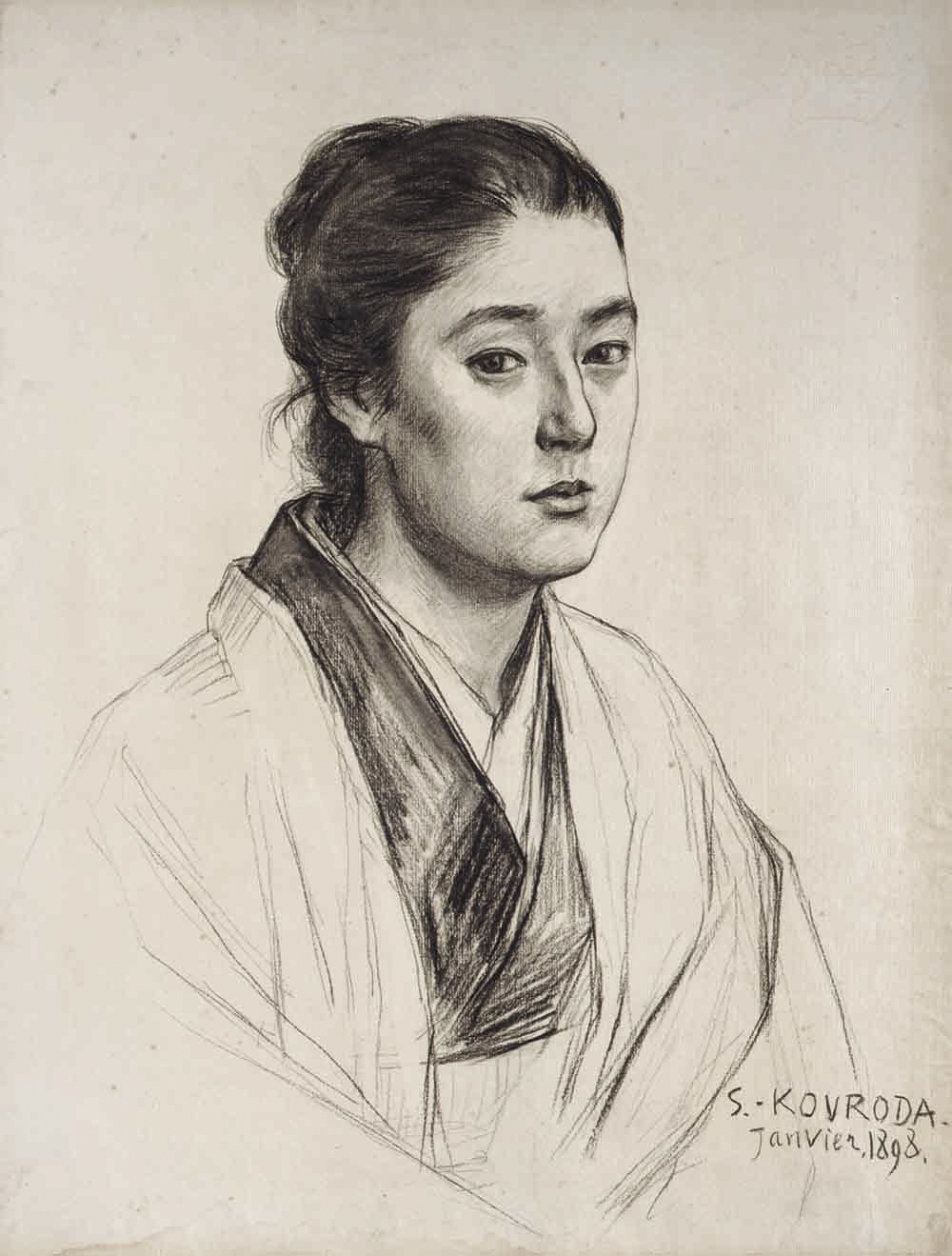
Portrait of a Woman (1898)

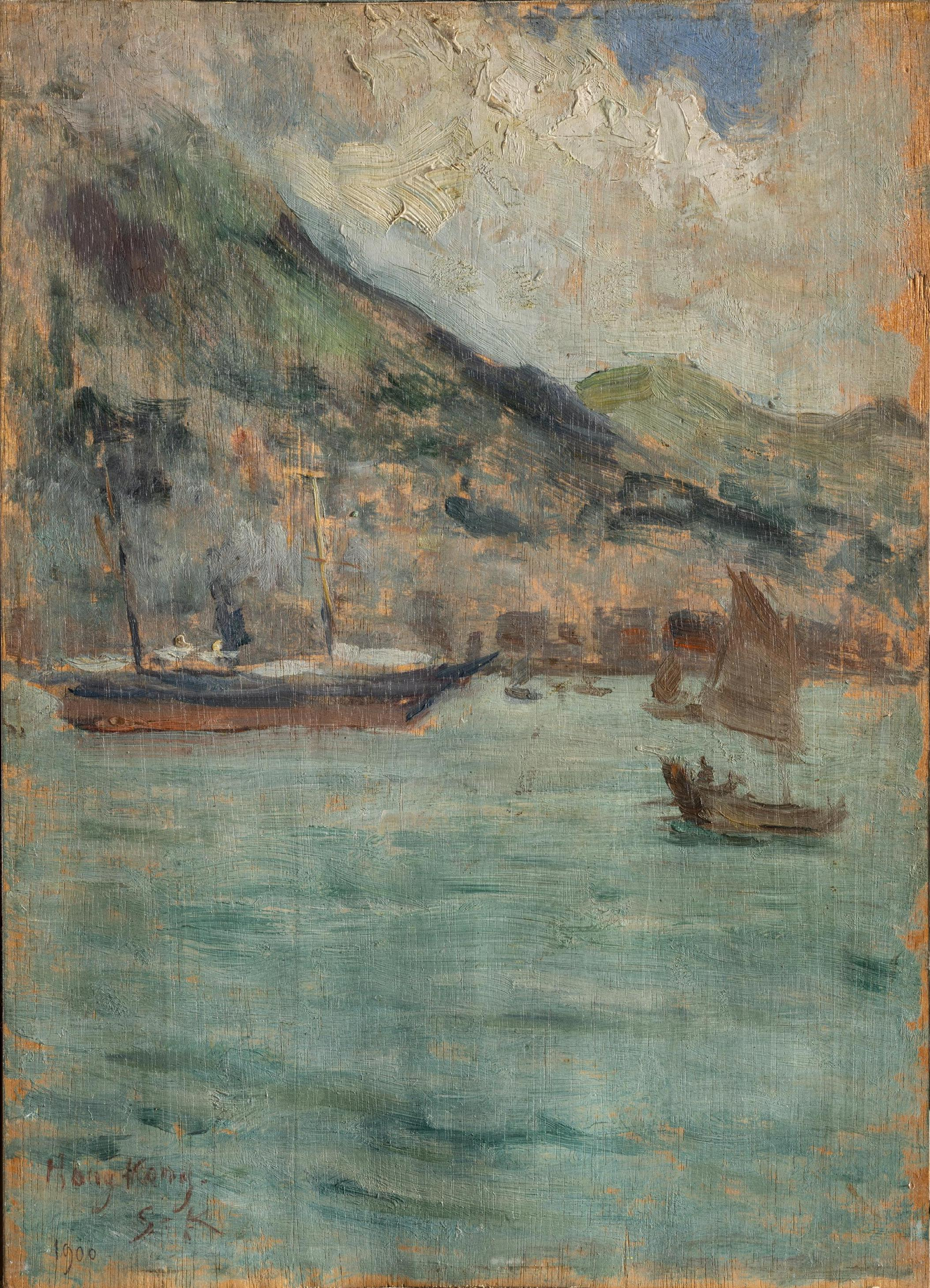
Hong Kong (1900)

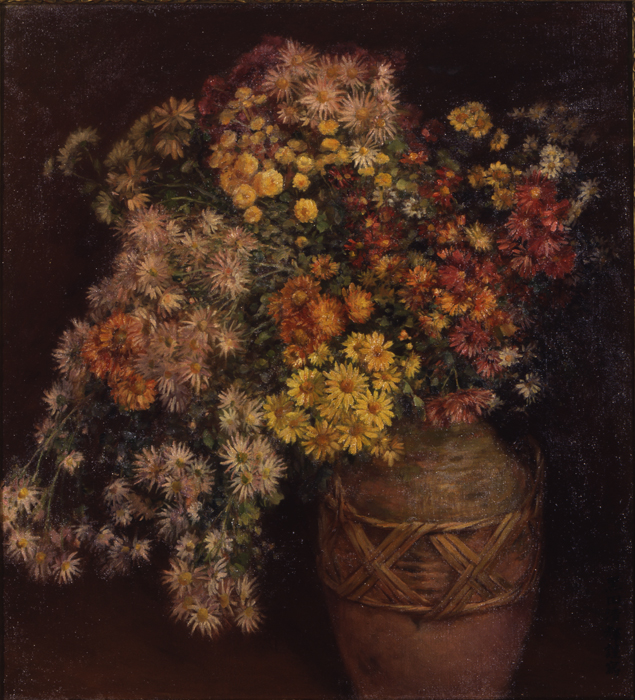
Jar of Flowers (1912)

=== Shiryokan (Research and Information Center) ===
The Shiryōkan (資料館, Research and Information Center) holds books, magazines, images, and other documents relating to history, archaeology, and the fine and applied arts in Japan, Asia, and the Middle East.

The Research and Information Center was opened in 1984. The floor open to the public includes two reading rooms, an exhibition area, and counters for requesting items held in the archives on the other floors. Free access is available without admission to the rest of the museum through the compound's west gate.

== Operating budget issues ==
The Japanese government's cultural budget is consistently low compared to similarly developed countries: in 2017, the cultural budget was one-fifth that of France and one-third that of South Korea. The Tokyo National Museum's annual budget is ¥2 billion, which is one-seventeenth that of the Louvre, one-fifth that of the British Museum, and one-third that of the National Museum of Korea. By 2023, the museum was struggling to delay repairs to cultural assets and pay utility bills for its facilities due to rising electricity and other costs. The museum has asked the government to increase its budget, but the request has not been granted. The museum's director often complains about its plight in the media.

== Publications ==
The museum has published a number of books about its collection and special exhibitions, including the following:

- 100 Masterpieces of Asian Art from the Tokyo National Museum Collection (2009)
- Noh Masks and Costumes Passed Down by the Konparu Troupe (2017), ISBN 9784907515256
- Noh Masks and Costumes of the Uesugi Clan (2019), ISBN 9784907515430
- Edo Fashion Kosode Robes (2020), ISBN 9784907515546
- Treasures of the Tokyo National Museum (2020), ISBN 9784907083656
- 50 Masterpieces of Japanese Art from the Tokyo National Museum Collection (2023)
- All About Japanese Archeology at the Tokyo National Museum (2023), ISBN 9784907515713
- Annual Rituals in the Illustrated Records of Court Ceremonies (2025), ISBN 9784907515812

== Access ==
- Ueno Station (with JR East and Tokyo Metro)
- Uguisudani Station (with JR East)
- Keisei Ueno Station (with Keisei Electric Railway)
- Nezu Station (with Tokyo Metro)

== See also ==
- Lists of National Treasures and Horyuji Treasures at the Tokyo National Museum
- Kuromon ("Black Gate"), one of two surviving feudal main gates in Tokyo
- Kyoto, Kyushu, and Nara National Museums
- Japanese art
- Greco-Buddhist art
- Silk Road
- Machida Hisanari
- Wuzhun Shifan
- List of largest art museums
- List of National Treasures of Japan
