= Dubilier =

Dubilier is the surname of the following notable people:

- Martin H. Dubilier (1926–1991), American businessman and inventor
  - Clayton, Dubilier & Rice, American private equity company founded by Martin
- Nicole Dubilier, American marine microbiologist
- William Dubilier (1888–1969), American electronics inventor, father of Martin
  - Dubilier Condenser Company founded by William
