= Joseph Rice =

Joseph Rice may refer to:

- Joseph John Rice (1871–1938), American prelate of the Roman Catholic Church
- Joseph Mayer Rice (1857–1934), physician, editor, and early advocate of progressive education
- Joseph Waldo Rice (1828–1915), American-born entrepreneur in Victoria, Australia
- Joseph L. Rice III (born 1932), American businessman
- Joe Rice (soccer) (born 1996), American soccer player

== See also ==
- Joe Rice (born 1967), Colorado politician
