= Silver mica capacitor =

Capacitors

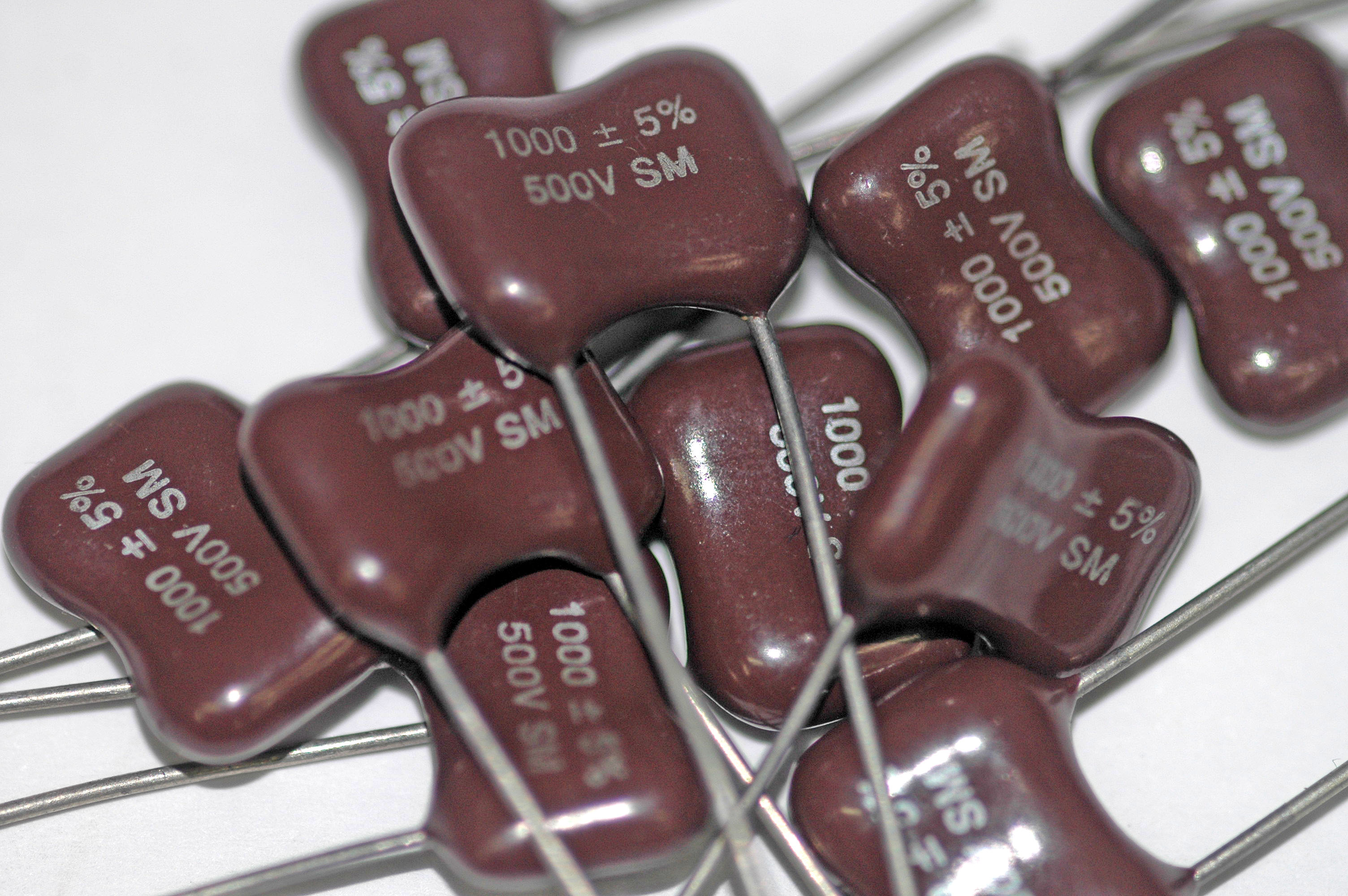
1000pF (1nF) silver mica capacitors

Silver mica capacitors are high precision, stable, and reliable capacitors made out of mica and silver. They are available in small values, and are mostly used at high frequencies and in cases where low losses (high Q) and low capacitor change over time is desired.

== History ==
Mica has been used as a capacitor dielectric since the mid-19th century. William Dubilier invented a small mica capacitor in 1909 which was used in decoupling applications. They were put into large scale commercial production to meet military requirements in World War I. Mica is less prone to crack under mechanical shock than glass, a useful property for equipment subject to shellfire. Like glass, mica has a substantially higher permittivity than paper so capacitors can be made smaller. In 1920 Dubilier developed a capacitor consisting of a flaked sheet of mica coated on both sides with silver. He formed the Dubilier Condenser Company to manufacture them. Ceramic capacitors were also used in the 1920s due to a shortage of mica, but by the 1950s silver mica had become the capacitor of choice for small-value RF applications. This remained the case until the latter part of the 20th century when advances in ceramic capacitors led to the replacement of mica with ceramic in most applications.

== Types ==
There are 2 distinct types of mica capacitor.

=== Clamped mica capacitors ===
Now obsolete, these were in use in the early 20th century. They consisted of sheets of mica and copper foil sandwiched together and clamped. These had even worse tolerance and stability than other clamped capacitors since the mica surface is not perfectly flat and smooth. References to mica capacitors from the 1920s often refer to this type.

=== Silver mica capacitors ===
Commonly known as silver mica capacitors, these rendered clamped mica capacitors obsolete. Instead of being clamped with foils these are assembled from sheets of mica coated on both sides with deposited metal. The assembly is dipped in epoxy. The advantages are:

- Greater stability, since there are no capacitive airgaps that can change dimension.
- Airtight enclosure removes the risk of oxidation or corrosion of plates or connections.
- Greater capacitance per volume, since there are no airgaps between plates and mica, the conducting surfaces can be thinner.
- No clamping mechanism is needed.

They are sometimes informally referred to as mica capacitors. Any modern reference to mica capacitors can be assumed to mean these, unless pre-World War II equipment is being discussed. Even though these capacitors are extremely useful, silver mica capacitors are less commonly used today due to bulkiness and high cost. There is a high level of compositional variation in the raw material leading to higher costs in relation to inspection and sorting. They are getting closer to obsolescence as advances are made in ceramic and porcelain materials.

Silver mica capacitors are still indispensable in some custom applications. Circuit designers still turn to mica capacitors for high-power applications such as RF transmitters and electric instruments and amplifiers because cheaper ceramic and porcelain capacitors can't withstand heat as well. Silver mica remains widely used in high-voltage applications, due to mica’s high breakdown voltage. Silver Mica capacitors are used at 100 V to 10 kV, ranging from a few pF up to a few nF, and the average temperature coefficient is around 50 ppm/°C.
