= Joseph L. Rice III =

American businessman (born 1932)

Joseph L. Rice III (born 1932) is an American businessman. He is a co-founder of Clayton, Dubilier & Rice, one of the oldest private equity investment firms in the world.

== Biography ==
=== Early life ===
Joseph L. Rice III was born in 1932. He graduated from Williams College in Williamstown, Massachusetts in 1954. From 1954 to 1957, he served as a Lieutenant in the United States Marine Corps. He returned to school, and received a J.D. from the Harvard Law School in Cambridge, Massachusetts in 1960.

=== Career ===
He joined the law firm Sullivan & Cromwell in 1960, where he practiced law until 1966. He then worked at Laird Inc., an investment banking firm, from 1966 to 1969. That year, in 1969, he founded Gibbons, Green & Rice.

In 1978, together with Martin H. Dubilier and Eugene Clayton, he co-founded Clayton, Dubilier & Rice, a private equity firm headquartered in New York City. In 2012, he announced he would step down as Chairman. The new Chairman is Donald J. Gogel. He currently serves as Executive-in-Residence at the Columbia Business School.

He is a former trustee of his alma mater, Williams College. He is a member of the Council on Foreign Relations and the Brookings Institution. He co-founded the Private Capital Research Institute. Additionally, he sits on the board of directors of the Marine Corps Heritage Foundation.

=== Personal life ===
He is married to Franci J. Blassberg. They have a daughter, Lee Ann. Mr. Rice has two children by a prior marriage, Kimberley Rice Kaestner and Daniel Spence Rice.
