= Clayton, Dubilier & Rice =

American private equity company

Clayton, Dubilier & Rice, LLC
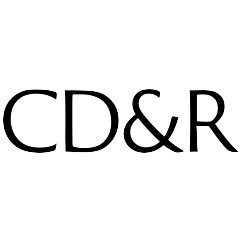
- Formerly: Clayton & Dubilier (1978-1992)
- Type: Private
- Industry: Private equity
- Founded: 1978; 48 years ago
- Founders: Martin H. Dubilier; Eugene Clayton; Bill Welsh
- Headquarters: New York City, New York, U.S.
- Key people: Donald J. Gogel (chairman); Nathan K. Sleeper (CEO); David Novak and Rick Schnall (co-presidents)
- Products: Investments; Private equity funds
- Website: www.cdr.com

Clayton, Dubilier & Rice, LLC (CD&R) is an American private equity company. CD&R is the 24th oldest private equity firm in the world. It has $30 billion invested in approximately 90 businesses.

CD&R had ownership stakes in, B&M Retail, Envision Healthcare, Hertz Global Holdings, Hussman International, WESCO International, US Foods, Sally Beauty, Diversey Holdings, VWR International, Brake Bros, Kinko's, Uniroyal, White Cap, TruGreen and Lexmark.

In June 2024, Clayton, Dubilier & Rice was ranked 11th in Private Equity International's PEI 300 ranking of the largest private equity firms in the world. In August 2024, the firm was named one of the best private equity firms of 2024 by GrowthCap.

== History ==
Clayton & Dubilier was founded as a turnaround management investment firm by Martin H. Dubilier, Eugene Clayton and Bill Welsh in 1976. Joseph L. Rice III joined in 1978, and the firm became known as Clayton, Dubilier & Rice in 1992. Clayton and Welsh retired from the firm in 1985 and Dubilier died in 1991.

In May 1985, CD&R acquired Uniroyal for $750 million.

In 1987, CD&R acquired Borg-Warner's Industrial Products Division, spinning the division off into a standalone company, BW/IP International. Between 1987 and 1992 the firm added nine new partners, five of which had previous experience as CEOs.

In 1988, the firm acquired Uniroyal Goodrich Tire Company and a 50% stake of B.F. Goodrich for $225 million; the Tire Company was sold to Michelin for $1.5 billion in 1989.

In 1990, CD&R formed Lexmark from IBM's printer and keyboard manufacturing business. The deal was named one of the 30 Most Influential Private Equity Deals by Private Equity International in 2004.

In 1995, CD&R acquired the foodservice division of Kraft Foods Inc..

In December 1997, CD&R sold a minority stake in its electrical equipment distribution business for about $300 million, four years after buying it from CBS for $340 million.

In 1998, Don Gogel was appointed CEO.

Also in 1998, CD&R established an office in London.

In 2001, Jack Welch, former CEO of General Electric, joined CD&R as a senior advisor.

In 2003, CD&R purchased the global provider of water treatment products and services, Culligan, from Veolia for $610 million, which included $200 million in equity from a CD&R-managed fund and the remainder from senior debt and securities. Centerbridge Partners acquired Culligan in 2012.

In 2005, CD&R partnered with Merrill Lynch, The Carlyle Group and Barclays to acquire Hertz Global Holdings from Ford Motor Company for $15 billion.

In February 2011, CD&R acquired Emergency Medical Services, the largest provider of ambulance services in the U.S., for $3.2 billion.

In August 2011, CD&R acquired 60% of Hussmann from Ingersoll-Rand for $370 million.

In 2012, Joe Rice stepped down as chairman, succeeded by Don Gogel.

In March 2013, CD&R partnered with the family owners of B&M retail, acquiring a 60 percent stake.

In October 2013, CD&R acquired a 60% stake in John Deere Landscapes (now SiteOne Landscape Supply) for $465 million; Deere & Co.retained a 40% stake.

In 2015, CD&R sold Hussmann to Panasonic for $1.5 billion.

Clayton Dubilier & Rice Fund X LP completed fundraising in 2017 with $10 billion of investor commitments.

CD&R acquired a 60% stake of Capco from FIS for $477 million in May 2017; Capco was acquired in 2021 by Wipro for $1.45 billion.

In August 2017, the firm acquired the Waterworks division of HD Supply for $2.5 billion, and changed its name to Core & Main.

In January 2018, Clayton, Dubilier & Rice acquired Ply Gem Holdings and Atrium Windows & Doors.

In October 2018, the firm acquired a stake in SmileDirectClub after investing $380 million.

In February 2018, CD&R acquired a 60% stake in American Greetings.

In January 2019, Clayton, Dubilier & Rice invested alongside the founder of WSH Investments Ltd., Alistair Storey, to take a major stake in the business.

In July 2019, Clayton, Dubilier & Rice was included on Inc.'s list of the "50 Best Private Equity Firms for Entrepreneurs".

In September 2019, CD&R acquired a stake in Socotec in a deal valuing Socotec at $1.98 billion.

In August 2020, CD&R acquired Epicor from KKR for $4.7 billion.

In January 2021, CD&R acquired Wolseley UK, the largest supplier of plumbing and building materials in the UK, for £308 million.

In October 2021, CD&R purchased Morrisons, a British supermarket chain, which subsequently had financial difficulties. During its bid to acquire Morrisons, CD&R faced accusations of asset stripping, that it left former acquisition Culligans 'saddled with over $850 million of debt'. UK politicians warned against leaving Morrisons prey to asset strippers.

In April 2022, CD&R acquired a 60% interest in Kindred Healthcare, the hospice and personal care divisions of Humana, for US$2.8 billion.

In May 2022, CD&R acquired Covetrus for $4 billion.

In July 2022, CD&R purchased the remaining common stock of Cornerstone Building Brands, completing its acquisition.

Also in July 2022, CD&R acquired the facilities services business OCS Group. This was then followed by the merger of OCS and the UK, Ireland and Asia operations of facilities management company Atalian.

In August 2023, funds affiliated by CD&R acquired Focus Financial Partners for $7 billion.

In April 2024, CD&R agreed to acquire Presidio.

In November 2023, CD&R acquired Veritiv for $2.6 billion.

In November 2024, funds managed by CD&R in partnership with TowerBrook Capital Partners acquired R1 RCM for $8.9 billion.

In February 2025, CD&R agreed to acquire a 50% stake in Opella, from Sanofi.

In November 2025, CD&R agreed to acquire the packaging company Sealed Air for a total enterprise value of $10.3 billion.
