= Dubilier Condenser Company =

- Industry: electronics
- Founded: 1920
- Founder: William Dubilier
- Products: capacitors

The Dubilier Condenser Company was the earliest commercial manufacturer of electronic capacitors (formerly known as condensers) which were widely used in early AM radio receivers (wireless sets). The company was founded in New York in 1920 by William Dubilier.

== History ==
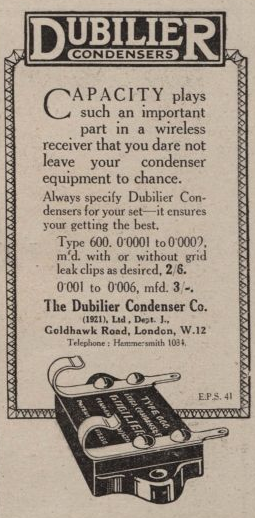
Advertisement from December 28, 1923 issue of Radio Times magazine

The company was founded in New York in 1920 by William Dubilier, who was responsible for many early developments in the field of electronics and radio, including the use of mica in capacitors. Dubilier was a name commonly found on capacitors in early wireless sets in Britain alongside TCC, Wima and others.

In 1923, Harry Houck joined Dubilier, later to become chief engineer.

Dubilier Condenser merged into Cornell-Dubilier in 1933.

In February, 1927, William Dubilier stepped down as president, naming Fred Williams as President and director of sales.

The former Cornell-Dubilier manufacturing site in South Plainfield, NJ became the subject of remediation under the U.S. Environmental Protection Agency’s Superfund program. According to the EPA, manufacturing activities at the facility (1936–1962) resulted in releases of polychlorinated biphenyls (PCBs) and chlorinated volatile organic compounds (VOCs), primarily trichloroethylene (TCE), contaminating soil, sediment, and groundwater. PCBs were used in capacitors manufactured at the site.

== See also ==
- History of radio
