= Martin H. Dubilier =

American businessman and inventor

Martin H. Dubilier (1926 – September 4, 1991) was an American businessman, inventor, and co-founder of Clayton, Dubilier & Rice. He invented a rust-resistant train track at the age of 12 and low-voltage flash bulbs, eliminating the need for battery packs, at the age of 18.

== Life ==
Martin Dubilier was the son of William Dubilier. Dubilier graduated from Princeton University in 1950 and Harvard Business School with an MBA in 1952.
