= William Dubilier =

American inventor

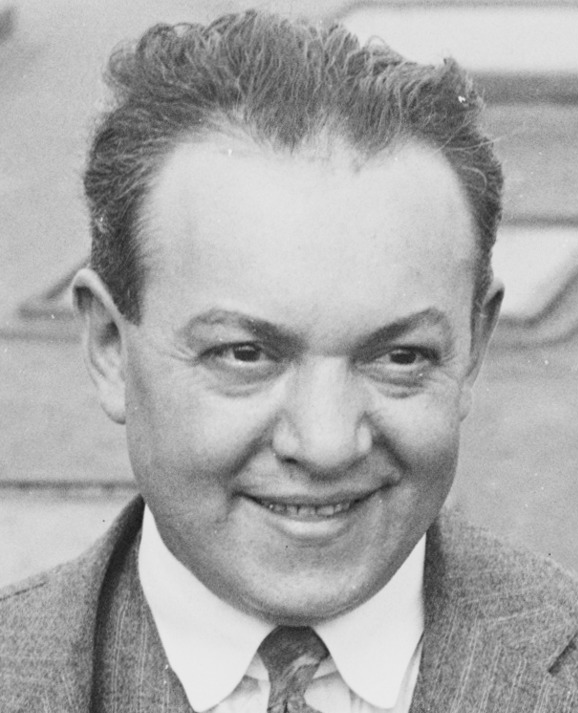

William Dubilier (July 25, 1888 in New York City– July 25, 1969) was an American inventor in the field of radio and electronics. He demonstrated radio communication at Seattle's Alaska–Yukon–Pacific Exposition on June 21, 1909; ten years before the first commercial station operated. A graduate of Cooper Union, he was the first to use sheets of naturally occurring mica as the dielectric in a capacitor. Mica capacitors were widely used in early radio oscillator and tuning circuits because the temperature coefficient of expansion of mica was low, resulting in very stable capacitance – mica capacitors are still used where exceptional temperature stability is needed.

He founded the Dubilier Condenser Company in New York in 1920. His son Martin H. Dubilier also became a prominent inventor and company founder.
