= Pre-charged =

Pre-charged may refer to:

- Pre-charge of the powerline voltages in a high voltage DC application;
- Pre-charged batteries, a type of rechargeable battery
