= Inrush current limiter =

Component used to limit inrush current

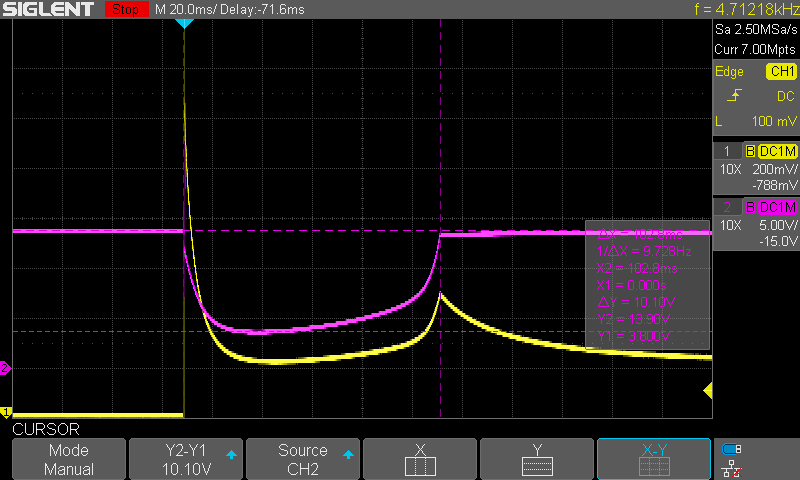
The inrush current of an incandescent lamp causes a bench power supply to limit its output current.

An inrush current limiter is a component used to limit inrush current to avoid gradual damage to components and avoid blowing fuses or tripping circuit breakers. Negative temperature coefficient (NTC) thermistors and fixed resistors are often used to limit inrush current. NTC thermistors can be used as inrush-current limiting devices in power supply circuits when added in series with the circuit being protected. They present a higher resistance initially, which prevents large currents from flowing at turn-on. As current continues to flow, NTC thermistors heat up, allowing higher current flow during normal operation. NTC thermistors are usually much larger than measurement-type thermistors and are purposely designed for power applications.

== Thermistor ==
An NTC thermistor's resistance is low at high temperatures. When the circuit is closed, the thermistor's resistance limits the initial current. After some time, current flow heats the thermistor, and its resistance changes to a lower value, allowing current to flow uninterrupted. It is inherently impossible for 100% of supply voltage to appear on the protected circuit, as the thermistor must continue dissipating power (producing heat) in order to maintain a low resistance. The resulting voltage drop from the operating resistance and the power consumption of the thermistor must be taken into account.

- Inrush current limiting thermistors are usually disk-shaped, with a radial lead on each side.
- NTC resistor power handling is proportional to its size.
- NTC resistors are rated according to their resistance at room temperature.

== Fixed resistor ==
Fixed resistors are also widely used to limit inrush current. These are inherently less efficient since the resistance never falls from the value required to limit the inrush current. Consequently, they are generally chosen for lower power circuitry, where the additional ongoing power waste is minor. Inrush limiting resistors are much cheaper than thermistors. They are found in most compact fluorescent lamps (light bulbs).

They can be switched out of the circuit using a relay or MOSFET after inrush current is complete.

== Applications ==
A typical application of inrush current limiters is in the input stage of non-power factor corrected switching supplies, to reduce the initial surge of current from the line input to the reservoir capacitor. The most popular application is the inrush protection of the AC current in switching power supplies (SPS). The primary reason for having surge current suppression in a SPS is to protect the diode bridge rectifier as the input or charging capacitor is initially charged. This capacitor draws significant current during the first half AC cycle and can subject the components in line with the capacitor to excessive current. The initial equivalent series resistance (ESR) of the capacitor provides very little protection for the diode bridge rectifier.

== See also ==
- Soft start
