= List of capacitor manufacturers =

A capacitor is a passive device on a circuit board that stores electrical energy in an electric field by virtue of accumulating electric charges on two close surfaces insulated from each other. This is a list of known capacitor manufacturers, their headquarters country of origin, and year founded. The oldest capacitor companies were founded over 100 years ago. Most older companies were founded during the AM radio era, which includes the World War II era and post war era. As the demand for advanced electronics continues to grow, the role of capacitor manufacturers becomes increasingly vital, supporting crucial domains like consumer electronics, power systems, automotive technology, and telecommunications. The industry has faced significant challenges, such as the capacitor plague, which refers to a widespread failure of electrolytic capacitors, particularly in consumer hardware, that occurred in the early 2000s. This issue arose primarily due to manufacturing defects, poor quality control, and the use of inferior materials, leading to failures characterized by bulging, leaking, or exploding capacitors.

== A ==
- AVX - United States - founded in 1972.

== C ==
- Cornell-Dubilier - United States - Dubilier founded in 1920.

== E ==
- EEStor - United States
- Epcos - Germany
- Europe Chemi-Con (ECC) - Japan
- Elna - Japan - founded in 1937.

== F ==
- FROLYT Kondensatoren und Bauelemente GmbH - Germany - founded in 1947

== G ==
- General Atomics Electromagnetic Systems (GA-EMS) - United States

== H ==
- Hitachi - Japan

== J ==
- Johanson Dielectrics - United States - founded in 1965.

== K ==
- KEMET - United States - founded in 1919.
- KOA - Japan - founded in 1940.

== M ==
- Man Yue - China
- Murata - Japan - founded in 1944.

== N ==
- Nichicon - Japan
- Nippon Chemi-Con (NCC) - Japan

== P ==
- Panasonic - Japan

== R ==
- Rubycon - Japan

== S ==
- Samsung - South Korea

== T ==
- Taiyo Yuden - Japan
- TDK - Japan

== U ==
- United Chemi-Con (UCC) - Japan

== V ==
- Vishay - United States - founded in 1962.

== W ==
- WIMA - Germany - founded in 1948.
- Würth - Germany - founded in 1945.

== Y ==
- Yageo - Taiwan - founded in 1977.
- YMIN - China - founded in 2001

== Defunct ==
- Mallory - United States - founded in 1916.
- Sprague - United States - founded in 1926.
- Grande Capacité - France
- A. H. Hunts - United Kingdom
- Procond Oy - Finland
- Marcon - Bought by Nippon Chemi-con
