= Black Gate =

Black Gate or Blackgate may refer to:

== Fictional ==
- Blackgate Penitentiary, a fictional prison in the DC Comics universe
- Ultima VII: The Black Gate, Part I of the computer game Ultima VII
- Black Gate or Morannon in J. R. R. Tolkien's Middle-earth, an entrance to Mordor
- Batman: Arkham Origins Blackgate, a 2013 video game
- Black Gate (manga), a Japanese manga written and illustrated by Yukiko Sumiyoshi
- The Black Gate, a 1919 American silent film produced by Vitagraph and starring Ruth Clifford

== Other uses ==
- The Black Gate (The Castle, Newcastle), a building at the archeological site The Castle, Newcastle upon Tyne, England
- Black Gate (capacitor), a brand of capacitor
- Black Gate (magazine), a fantasy and science fiction magazine

== See also ==
- Porta Nigra (Latin for black gate), a large Roman city gate in Trier, Germany
- Kuromon (Japanese for black gate), in Tokyo, Japan
