= Genius in the Library: This Bookish Rookie Will Save the Day! =

Japanese light novel series

- First light novel volume cover

図書館の天才少女 ～本好きの新人官吏は膨大な知識で国を救います！～ (Toshokan no Tensai Shōjo: Honzuki no Shinjin Kanri wa Bōdai na Chishiki de Kuni o Sukuimasu!)
- Genre: Fantasy
- Novel series
- Written by: Misa Aoi
- Published by: Kakuyomu
- Original run: April 14, 2023 – present
- Light novel
- Written by: Misa Aoi
- Illustrated by: Yoh Hihara
- Published by: Fujimi Shobo
- English publisher: NA: J-Novel Club
- Imprint: Kadokawa Books
- Original run: April 10, 2024 – present
- Volumes: 5
- Manga
- Written by: Misa Aoi
- Illustrated by: Yohi Suzu
- Published by: Enterbrain
- Imprint: B's Log Comics
- Magazine: B's Log Comic
- Original run: September 5, 2024 – present
- Volumes: 2

Genius in the Library: This Bookish Rookie Will Save the Day! (図書館の天才少女 ～本好きの新人官吏は膨大な知識で国を救います！～, Toshokan no Tensai Shōjo: Honzuki no Shinjin Kanri wa Bōdai na Chishiki de Kuno o Sukuimasu!) is a Japanese light novel series written by Misa Aoi and illustrated by Yoh Hihara. It began serialization as a web novel on Kakuyomu in April 2023. It later began publication under Fujimi Shobo's Kadokawa Books light novel imprint in April 2024. A manga adaptation illustrated by Yohi Suzu began serialization in Enterbrain's josei manga magazine B's Log Comic in September 2024.

== Synopsis ==
Martina is a girl with a massive love for reading books, so much so that she's read every book in her town's library. She sets her sights on the civil servant exam, so she can access the palace's royal library. She later succeeds in the exam, giving her access to the library. However, monsters start attacking the palace and threatening the library, so Martina decides to use her photographic memory from all the books she has read to defend the kingdom.

== Media ==
=== Light novel ===
Written by Misa Aoi, Genius in the Library: This Bookish Rookie Will Save the Day! began serialization as a web novel on Kadokawa Corporation's Kakuyomu website on April 14, 2023. It later began publication with illustrations by Yoh Hihara under Fujimi Shobo's Kadokawa Books light novel imprint on April 10, 2024. Five volumes have been released as of June 10, 2026.

During their panel at Anime Expo 2026, J-Novel Club announced that it had licensed the series for English publication, with the first volume set to release in October later in the year.

No.	Original release date	Original ISBN	North American release date	North American ISBN
1	April 10, 2024	978-4-04-075390-4	October 14, 2026	978-1-71-837210-8
1. "Martina, the Civil Servant"; 2. "In Times of Crisis"; 3. "The Miasmic Hollow Survey Team"; 4. "Calling for Aid and Going to Rescue"; 5. "The Kaddour Earldom"; 6. "Martina's Day Off"; 7. "A New Strategy"; 8. "The Grand Convocation"; 9. "Dark Magic"; 10. "Saint Summoning"; Side story: "General Affairs' Day Out"
2	November 9, 2024	978-4-04-075658-5	January 27, 2027	978-1-71-837212-2
3	June 10, 2025	978-4-04-075803-9	—	—
4	November 10, 2025	978-4-04-076053-7	—	—
5	June 10, 2026	978-4-04-076440-5	—	—

=== Manga ===
A manga adaptation illustrated by Yohi Suzu began serialization in Enterbrain's josei manga magazine B's Log Comic on September 5, 2024. The manga's chapters have been compiled into two tankōbon volumes as of April 2026.

No.	Release date	ISBN
1	August 1, 2025	978-4-04-738532-0
2	April 1, 2026	978-4-04-738835-2

== Reception ==
The series, alongside I Have No Need for Your Love, won the Light Novel Prize at the 2026 Digital Comic Awards.
