= Chemicon =

Chemicon may refer to:

- Chemicon, a biotechnology company acquired by Merck Millipore
- Chemi-con, a Japanese manufacturer of electrical components
