= Nippon Chemi-Con =

Japanese electronics corporation

Nippon Chemi-Con Corporation
- CHEMI-CON logo
- Native name: 日本ケミコン株式会社
- Company type: Public KK
- Traded as: TYO: 6997
- ISIN: JP3701200002
- Industry: Electronics
- Founded: as Satoh Denki Kogyosho (August 1931; 94 years ago)
- Founder: Toshio Satoh
- Headquarters: Osaki, Shinagawa-ku, Tokyo 141-8605, Japan; 35.622599°N 139.724300°E
- Area served: Worldwide
- Key people: Norio Kamiyama (President and CEO)
- Products: Capacitors; Precision mechanical components; Electronic components
- Revenue: ▲¥161,881 million (2023)
- Operating income: ▲¥12,940 million (2023)
- Net income: ▲¥2,273 million (2023)
- Total assets: ▲¥162,741 million (2023)
- Total equity: ▲¥50,257 million (2023)
- Number of employees: 6,045 (consolidated, as of March 31, 2023)
- Website: Official website

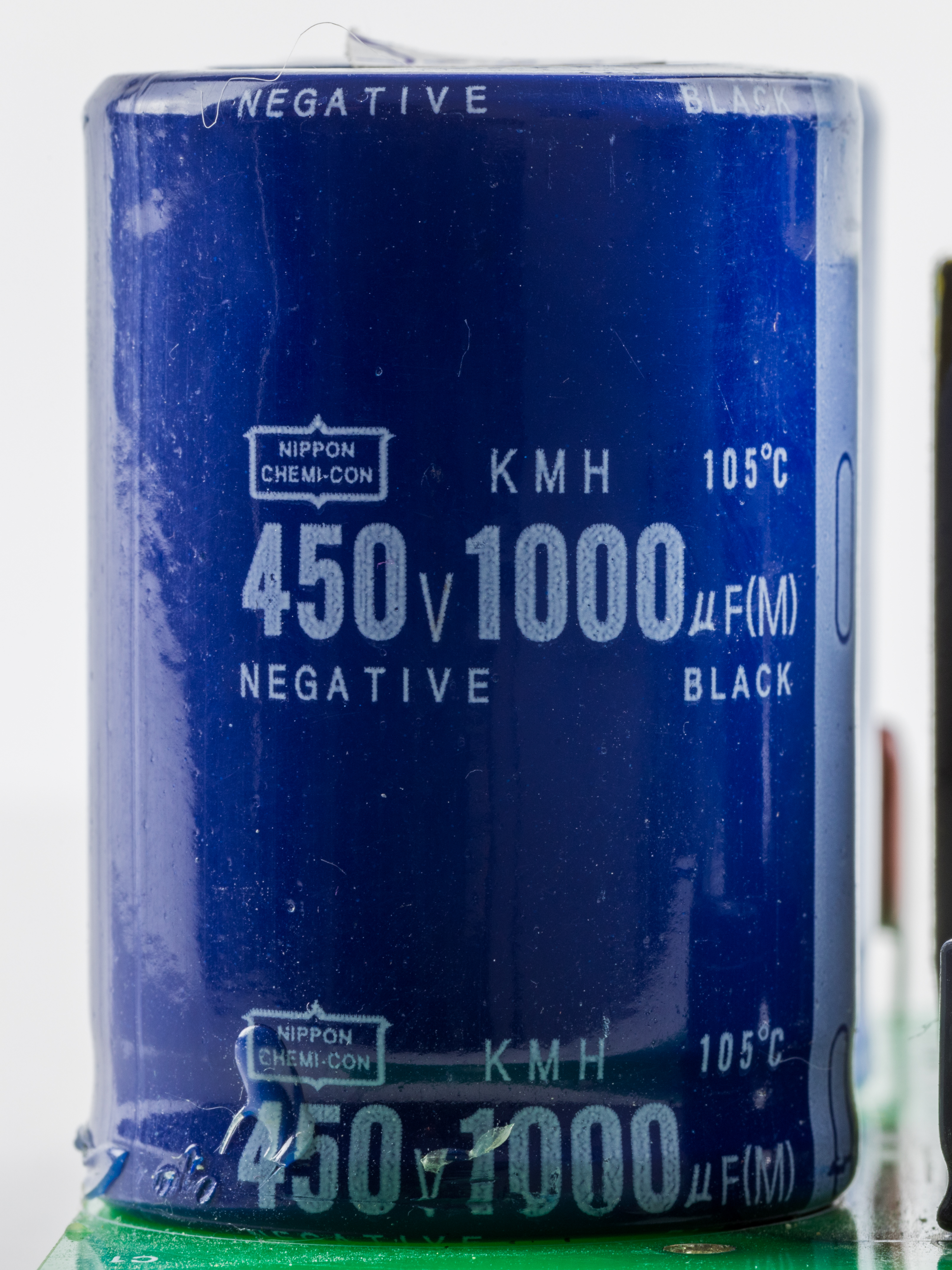
Aluminium electrolytic capacitor, 1000 μF, 450V

Nippon Chemi-Con Corporation (日本ケミコン株式会社, Nippon Kemikon Kabushiki-gaisha) is a Japanese corporation that produces capacitors and other discrete electronic components.

Nippon Chemi-Con was founded in 1931 by Toshio Satoh in Japan.

== Price fixing ==
On March 22, 2018, the European Union fined Nippon Chemi-Con €98 million for historical price fixing, alongside other companies including Nichicon and Rubycon.

== Subsidiaries ==
Nippon Chemi-Con has two wholly owned subsidiaries: United Chemi-Con (in the United States) and Europe Chemi-Con (in Germany).
