= Black Gate (capacitor) =

Black Gate is the name of a brand of audio grade electrolytic capacitor made in Japan by Rubycon Corporation.

Black Gate capacitors base their manufacture on something called 'The Transcendent Electron Transfer' theory. The manufacturer attributes the capacitor's sonic quality to the use of fine graphite particles used in the separator between its anode and cathode.

== Settling-in Period ==
Many audiophiles believe it can take many hours before the maximum sonic benefits are heard in audio circuits that use Black Gates. This long settling-in procedure is often a controversial issue when auditioning such equipment, as the frequency response is said to tend to shift around greatly during this period, making the equipment sound different from one audition to another. This settling period or burn in period was most likely attributed to the aluminum layer completing its reaction to form a complete and stable oxide layer on its surface once current and voltage are applied to the capacitor in a circuit.

== Production ==
The Black Gate production has stopped in 2006, said to be caused by problems between Jelmax Co., Ltd. and Rubycon Corp., after 18 years of availability. The capacitors were manufactured by Rubycon under license for Jelmax Co., Ltd. which should close its doors in August 2007, once all their stocks get sold out.

== See also ==
- High-end audio
- DIY audio
