= Akamon (Tokyo) =

Historical Japanese gate

- 赤門
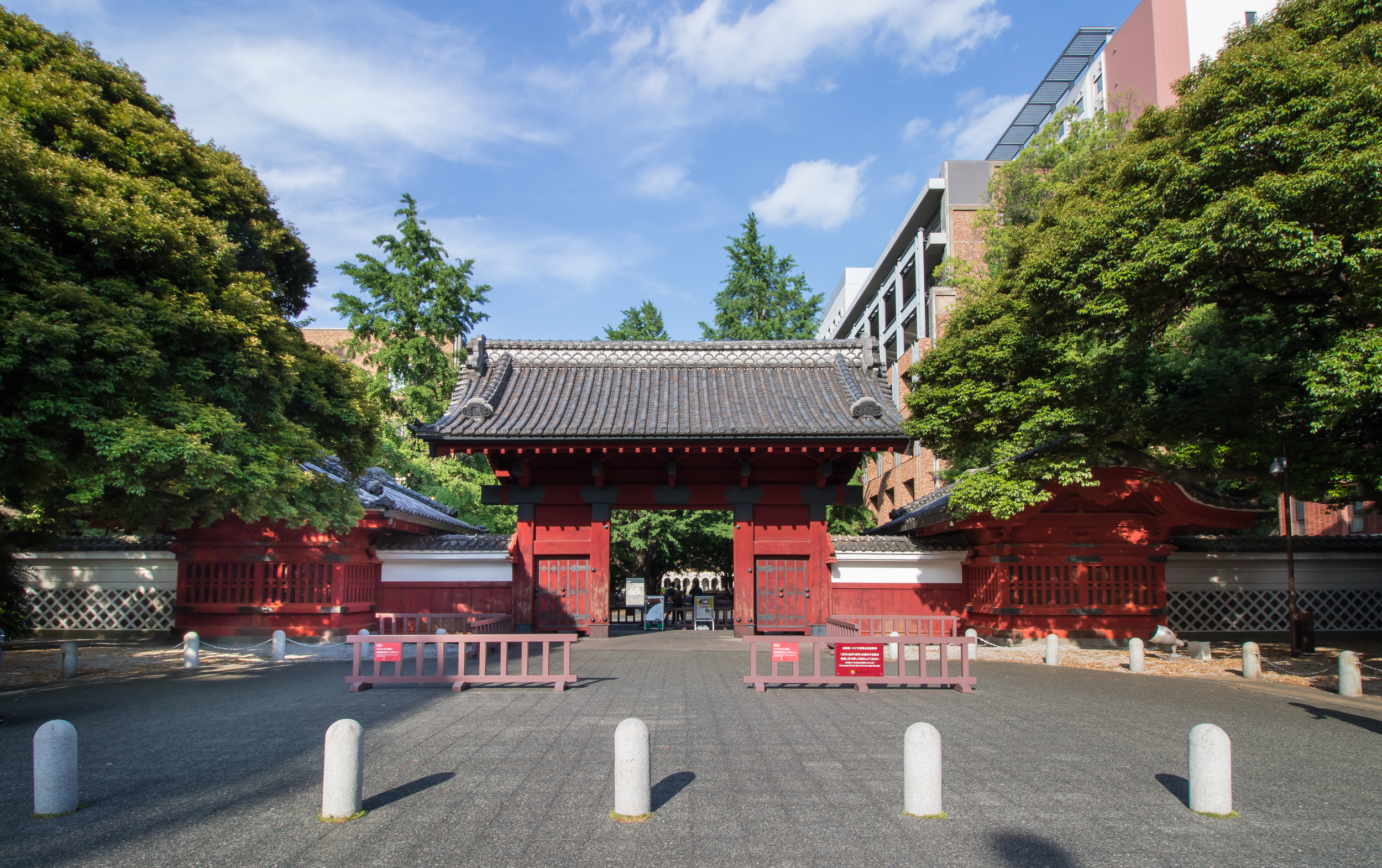
- Front view of the Akamon
- Interactive map of Akamon
- Location: 7 Chome-3-1 Hongō, Bunkyō, Tokyo 〒 113-0033
- Coordinates: 35°42′38″N 139°45′37″E
- Type: gate (mon)
- Material: wood?
- Completion date: 1827 (late Edo period)

Akamon (赤門, Red gate) is a historical gate (mon) located in Bunkyō, Tokyo, Japan.

One of two remaining gates of the Edo period daimyō mansions in the city (the other one is Kuromon, currently located in the Tokyo National Museum).

It was constructed in 1827 in the late Edo period in the residence of the Maeda clan in Edo. The purpose of the gate was to welcome Lady Yasu-hime, a daughter of Tokugawa Ienari, as a bride for Nariyasu Maeda.

It is currently located in the grounds of the University of Tokyo, and it has been designated an Important Cultural Property. Before World War II it was registered as a National Treasure.

== History ==
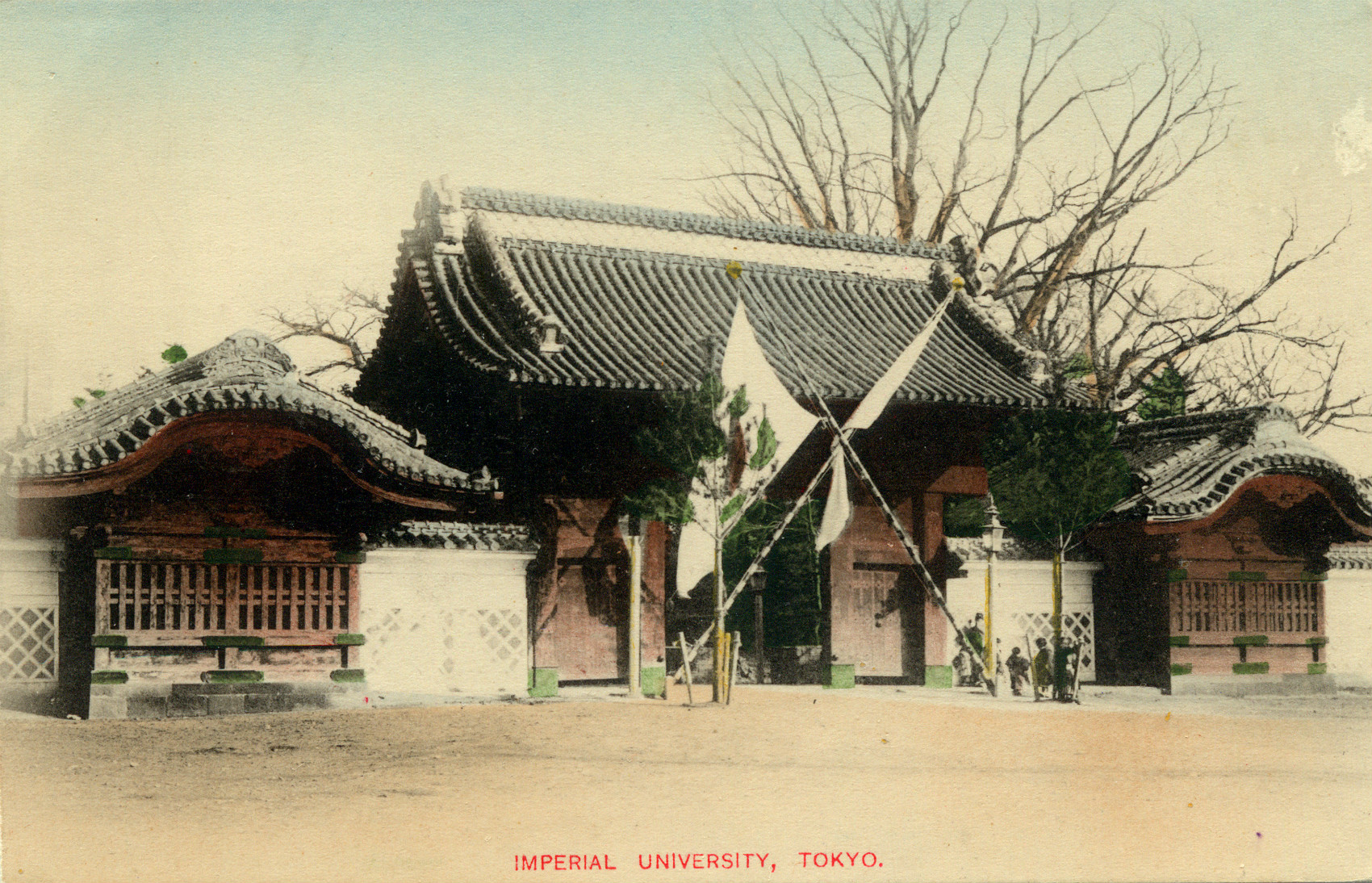
Akamon in ca. 1905

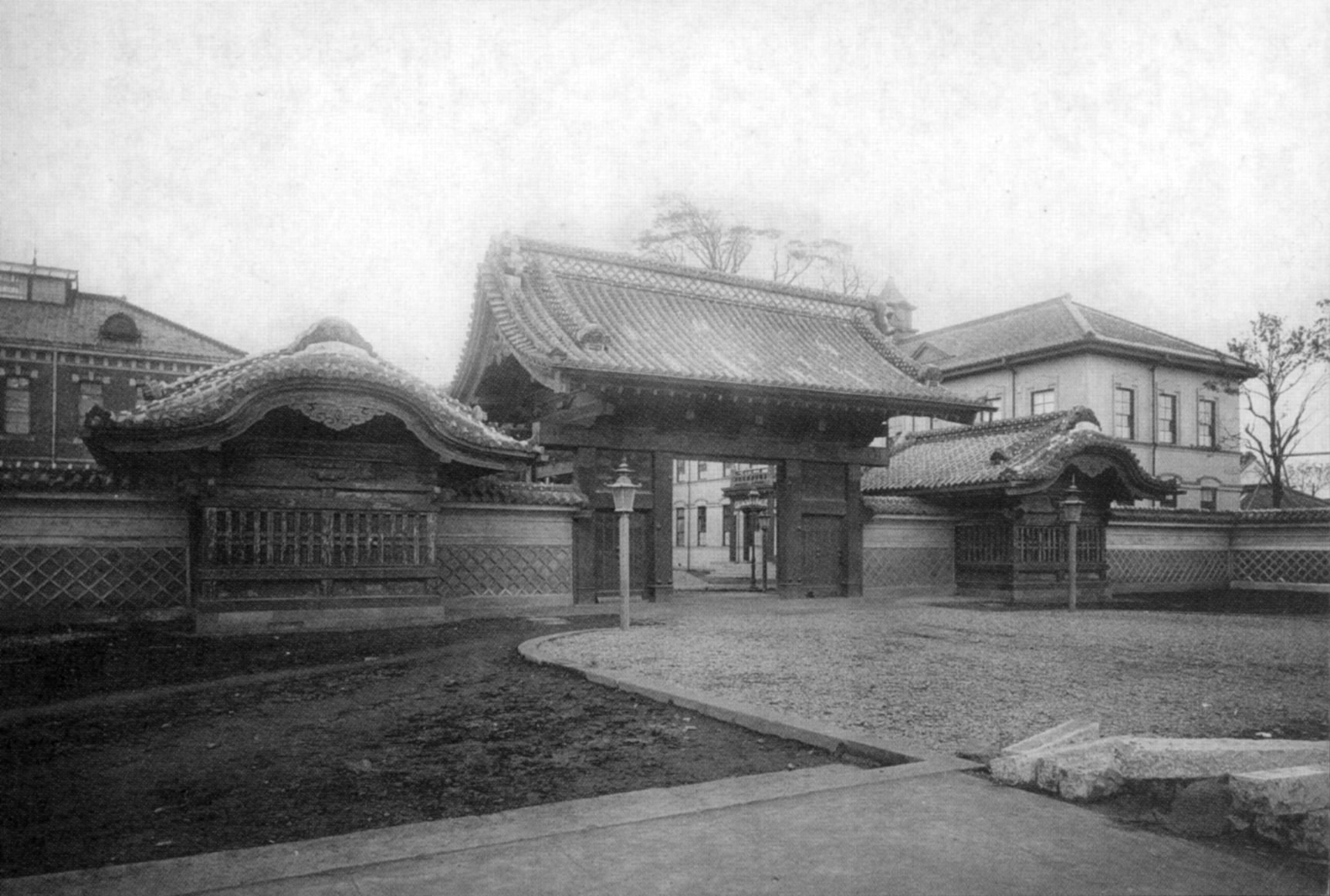
Akamon in ca. 1910

Akamon was built in 1827 in the residence of the Maeda clan in Edo by Nariyasu Maeda (1811-1884), the 12th Lord of the Kaga. This residence stood in what is now the Hongo Campus of the University of Tokyo. The occasion for building the gate was to welcome Lady Yasu (1813-1868), the 21st daughter of Tokugawa Ienari (1773–1841), the 11th Tokugawa shōgun, as a bride for Nariyasu Maeda.

The Maeda clan was one of the most powerful samurai families in Japan. They ruled the Kaga Domain, which was associated to the provinces of Kaga, Noto and Etchū in modern-day Ishikawa Prefecture and Toyama Prefecture on the island of Honshū.

In 1903 the gate became the entrance for the University of Tokyo.

At the end of the Meiji period (1868-1912), it was moved to its current location, 15 meters west of where it originally stood.

The gate was closed in February 2021 over structural integrity concerns. An inspection revealed that the gate may collapse during an earthquake or typhoon. The university plans to eventually reinforce the gate's column bases and lighten the 30 ton roof to make it safe enough to re-open.

== Access ==
Akamon is located in the grounds of the Hongo Campus in the University of Tokyo. There is no entrance fee.

It can be seen from the street. Although previously open to the public, it is currently closed due to fears of collapse during an earthquake or typhoon.
