= Nichicon =

Manufacturer of capacitors of various types

Nichicon Corporation

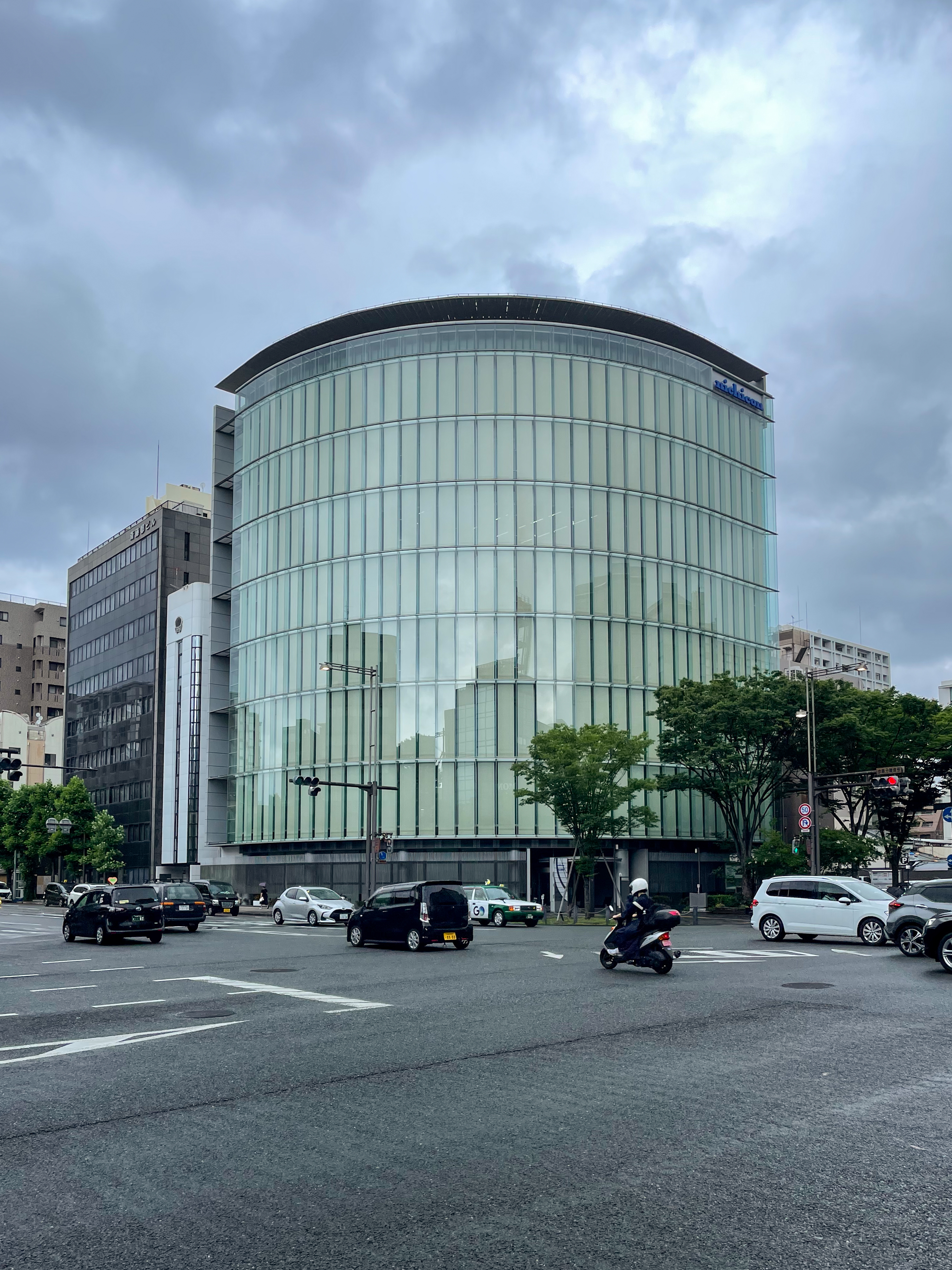
- Nichicon Building in Nakagyo-ku, Kyoto
- Native name: ニチコン株式会社
- Company type: Public KK
- Traded as: TYO: 6996; OSE: 6996
- Industry: Electronics
- Founded: (August 1, 1950; 75 years ago)
- Headquarters: Nakagyo-ku, Kyoto 604-0845, Japan
- Key people: Ippei Takeda (Chairman and CEO); Shigeo Yoshida (President and COO)
- Products: Capacitors; Hybrid integrated circuits; Thermistors
- Revenue: ▲JPY 107.2 billion (FY 2014) (US$ 893.3 million) (FY 2014)
- Net income: ▼JPY 2.25 billion (FY 2014) (US$ 18.7 million) (FY 2014)
- Number of employees: 5,792 (consolidated, as of March 31, 2014)
- Website: Official website

Nichicon Corporation (ニチコン株式会社, Nichikon Kabushiki-gaisha) is a manufacturer of capacitors of various types, and is one of the largest manufacturers of capacitors in the world, headquartered in Karasuma Oike, Nakagyō-ku, Kyoto, Japan. In 1950, it separated from the Nii Works Co., established itself as Kansai-Nii Works and completed its first factory by 1956. In 1961, it adopted the Nichicon name and has been using it, or a variant thereof, ever since.

In 2011 and 2012 Nichicon spun off several major factories into independent subsidiaries, and established representative branches in foreign countries, thus realigning its corporate infrastructure.

== Early 2000s capacitor issues ==
From 2001 to 2004, Nichicon produced defective capacitors ("HM" and "HN" series) that were used by major computer manufacturers, including Dell, Hewlett-Packard, and Apple. No explanation has been given for the production runs of defective capacitors, but some sources claimed that these capacitors were either overfilled with electrolyte, or were constructed using electrolyte that was prone to leaking, causing premature failure in any equipment using them. This issue was not related to the Taiwanese capacitor plague.

In 2010 Dell settled a civil lawsuit concerning its shipment of at least 11.8 million computers from May 2003 to July 2005 that used faulty Nichicon components and were prone to major failure.
