= Yukiko Sumiyoshi =

Japanese manga artist

Yukiko Sumiyoshi (住吉 文子, Sumiyoshi Yukiko, born 2 October 1982) is a Japanese manga artist. She has been creating manga since her debut title, Ten no Otoshimono, was first released in 2004. She is also notable as the artist for the manga version of Key's visual novel Tomoyo After: It's a Wonderful Life, and she also illustrated the fourth Clannad manga.

== Works ==
- Clannad: Tomoyo Dearest
- Reverse / End
- Tamago no Kimi.
- Ten no Otoshimono
- Tomoyo After: Dear Shining Memories
- Black Gate
