= B's Log =

Japanese gaming magazine

- Cover of December 2024 issue
- Categories: Video game
- Frequency: Monthly
- Format: Paper and online magazine
- Circulation: 90,000
- Publisher: Enterbrain (2000–2013); Kadokawa (2013–2017); Gzbrain (2017–2019); Kadokawa Game Linkage (2019-)
- First issue: March 2002; 24 years ago
- Country: Japan
- Based in: Tokyo
- Language: Japanese
- Website: www.bs-log.com/

B's LOG (sometimes stylized as B's-LOG) is a Japanese gaming magazine, published in both print and digital formats, by Kadokawa Game Linkage (via Enterbrain), aimed at the female market. Games covered in this publication typically fall into the otome and BL genres. According to parent company Kadokawa, it has a circulation of 90,000; its readerbase is 99% female with an average age of 22.

A renewal issue was published on July 20, 2020, with a focus on idols that appear in games.

== B's LOG COMIC ==
B's LOG COMIC
- Categories: Shōjo/Josei manga
- Frequency: Monthly
- Format: Formerly paper, now online magazine
- Publisher: Enterbrain, Kadokawa, DMM.com
- First issue: December 2005; 20 years ago
- Country: Japan
- Based in: Tokyo
- Language: Japanese
- Website: http://bslogcomic.com/index.html

B's LOG COMIC is a manga spinoff magazine which ran in print from December 2005 (when it launched as monthly magazine Comic B's LOG, before changing to a bimonthly format as Comic B's-Log Kyun! in 2009 and later in 2013 returning to a monthly format with its current title) until Spring 2018. As of 2021, it still remains active in a digital format. Some of its titles have been based on otome and BL games, including Dramatical Murder, Hiiro no Kakera, Hakuoki, Starry Sky, Togainu no Chi, Uta no Prince-sama, and VitaminZ, as well as other games including Valkyria Chronicles; other titles from this publication include Black Gate and Shōnen Maid.

The magazine collaborated with konbini chain Lawson to create Convenience Store Boy Friends.

== B's LOG Bunko and Bunko Alice ==
B's LOG Bunko is a subdivision that releases paperback light novels. One title published by this imprint is Ririka Yoshimura's Jyuniya — Migawari Koshou to Fukigenna Koushaku (十二夜 ―身代わり小姓と不機嫌な公爵―; 'Twelfth Night: The Substitute Page and the Grumpy Duke', ISBN 9784047280090), an adaptation of Shakespeare's Twelfth Night. On April 15, 2015, the further imprint B's LOG Bunko Alice was launched.

== Collaborations ==
In 2014, the magazine released a series of voice cards in collaboration with Konami series Tokimeki Memorial Girl's Side, featuring four characters from the various titles in the series acting in the role of a husband.

In July 2015, B's LOG ran a design contest for clothing to appear on characters in the then-upcoming release of Kiniro no Corda 4.

On April 27, 2018, then-parent company GzBrain opened cafe GzCafe in Ikebukuro, showcasing brands B's LOG and sister publication Famitsu and holding events such as talks with creators.

== Other releases ==
B's LOG Party
- Platform: PlayStation Portable
- Release: JP: May 20, 2010 (PSP)
- Genre: Board game
- Modes: Single-player, multiplayer

B's LOG Party for PlayStation Portable (released on May 20, 2010) is a board game-style title featuring characters from Hakuoki, Hanayoi Romanesque, Hiiro no Kakera, and Otometeki Koi Kakumei Love Revo!!. Two songs from this game were included on the compilation album Otomate Vocal Best Vol. 2.
