= Kuromon (Tokyo) =

- 黒門
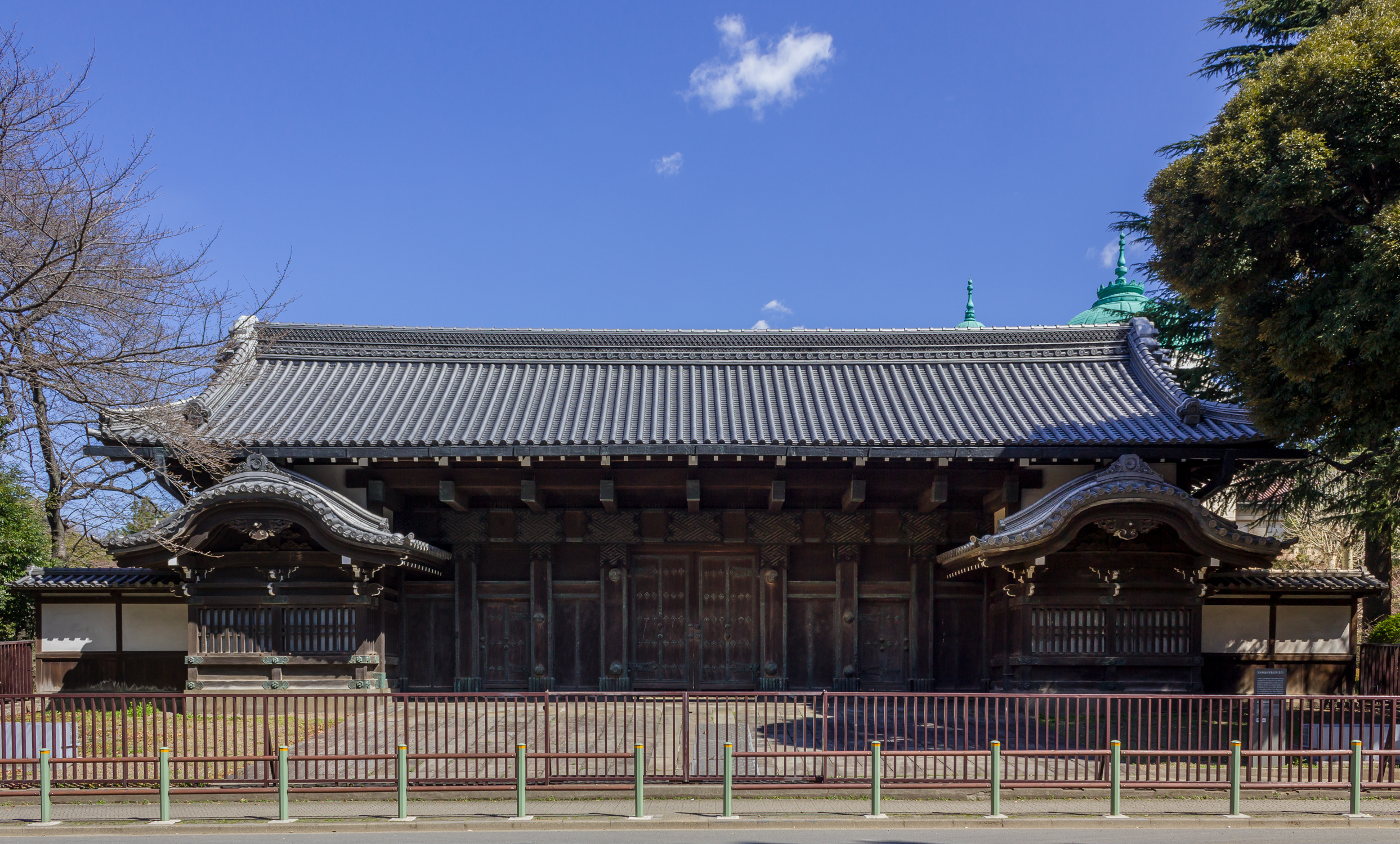
- Front view
- Interactive map of the Kuromon area

General information
- Type: Mon (Japanese gate)
- Architectural style: East Asian hip-and-gable roof
- Location: Tokyo National Museum, 13-9 Uenokoen, Taitō, Tokyo 〒 110-8712
- Coordinates: 35°43′05″N 139°46′29″E
- Completed: Late Edo period (late 18th century or early 19th century)
- Relocated: 1954

Technical details
- Material: Dark wood

Kuromon (黒門, Black Gate) is an historical mon (Japanese gate) that originally stood at a daimyo (feudal lord) mansion in Marunouchi, Tokyo, Japan. Though the exact date of its construction is uncertain, the consensus is that it was in the late Edo period, probably in the late 18th century or early 19th century. It now stands in the grounds of the Tokyo National Museum in Taitō ward. Kuromon is one of two surviving gates of Edo-period daimyo mansions in Tokyo. It is designated an Important Cultural Property of Japan.

== History ==
Kuromon was the main gate of a daimyo mansion of the Ikeda clan branch from the Tottori Domain, which included the Inaba Province and Hōki Province in the modern-day Tottori Prefecture. The mansion was built in the Marunouchi area (now Marunouchi 3-chome) of Edo (now called Tokyo), and was part of the daimyō kōji (大名小路, daimyo alley), which included 24 such mansions.

In 1892 the gate was moved to Meiji-era Tōgū Palace in Akasaka, Tokyo, and some time later to the residence of Prince Takamatsu (1905–1987), the third son of Emperor Taishō. It was designated an Important Cultural Property of Japan in September 1951. In March 1954 it was moved and reassembled in its current location in the Tokyo National Museum. It is one of two surviving gates of Edo-period daimyo mansions in Tokyo (the other being Akamon, which is on the campus of the University of Tokyo).

== Architecture ==
The gate has a large hipped-gable roof construction, with smaller karahafu rooves on the sides, covering the guards' chambers. It is made of dark wood, hence the name Black Gate.

== Access ==
Kuromon is in the grounds of the Tokyo National Museum, but can be seen from the street with no admission fee. It can be seen more closely by purchasing an entry ticket to the museum. On Saturdays, Sundays and holidays, between 10 am and 4 pm, the gate is opened and visitors can walk through it.

== Gallery ==
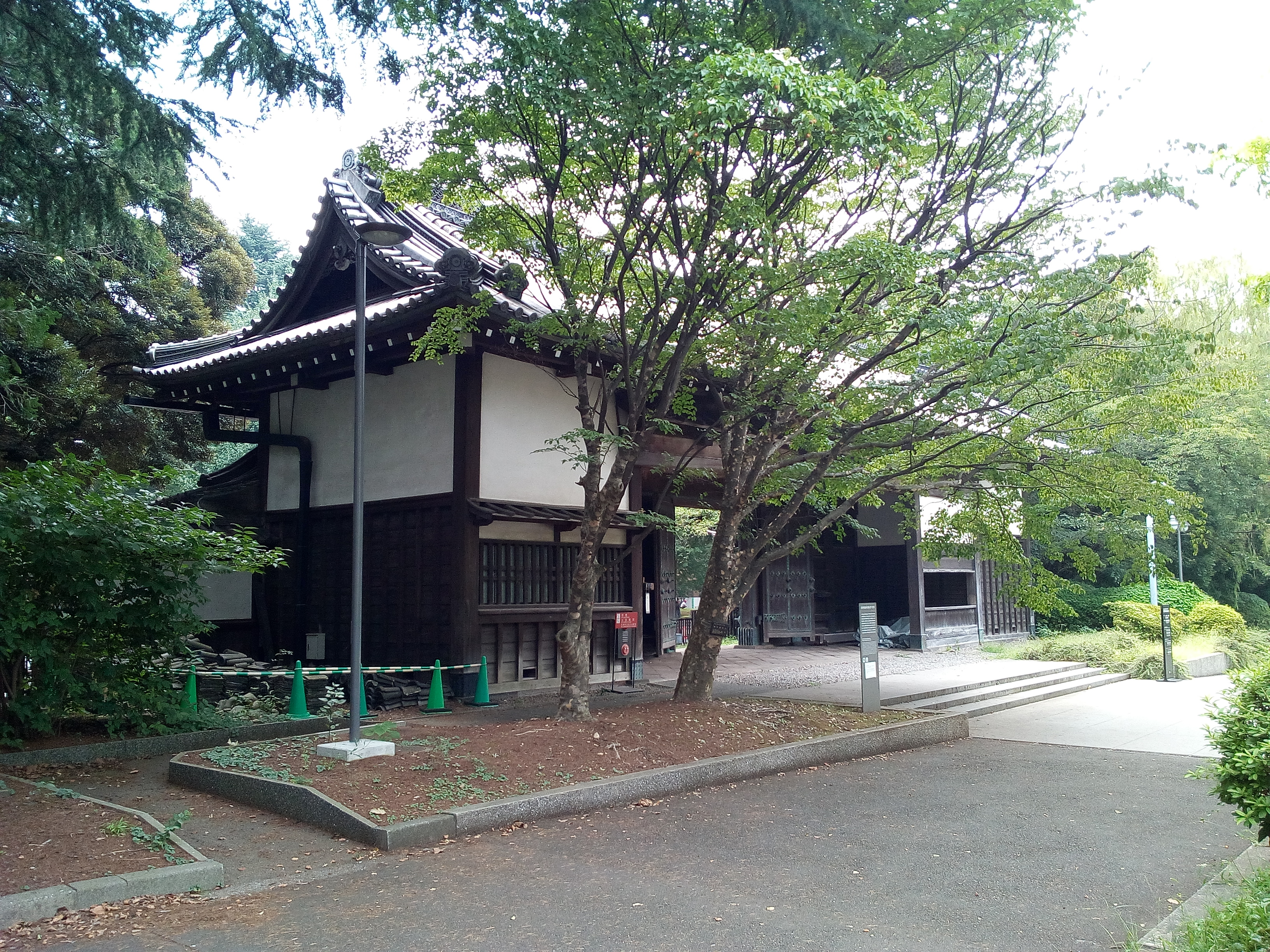

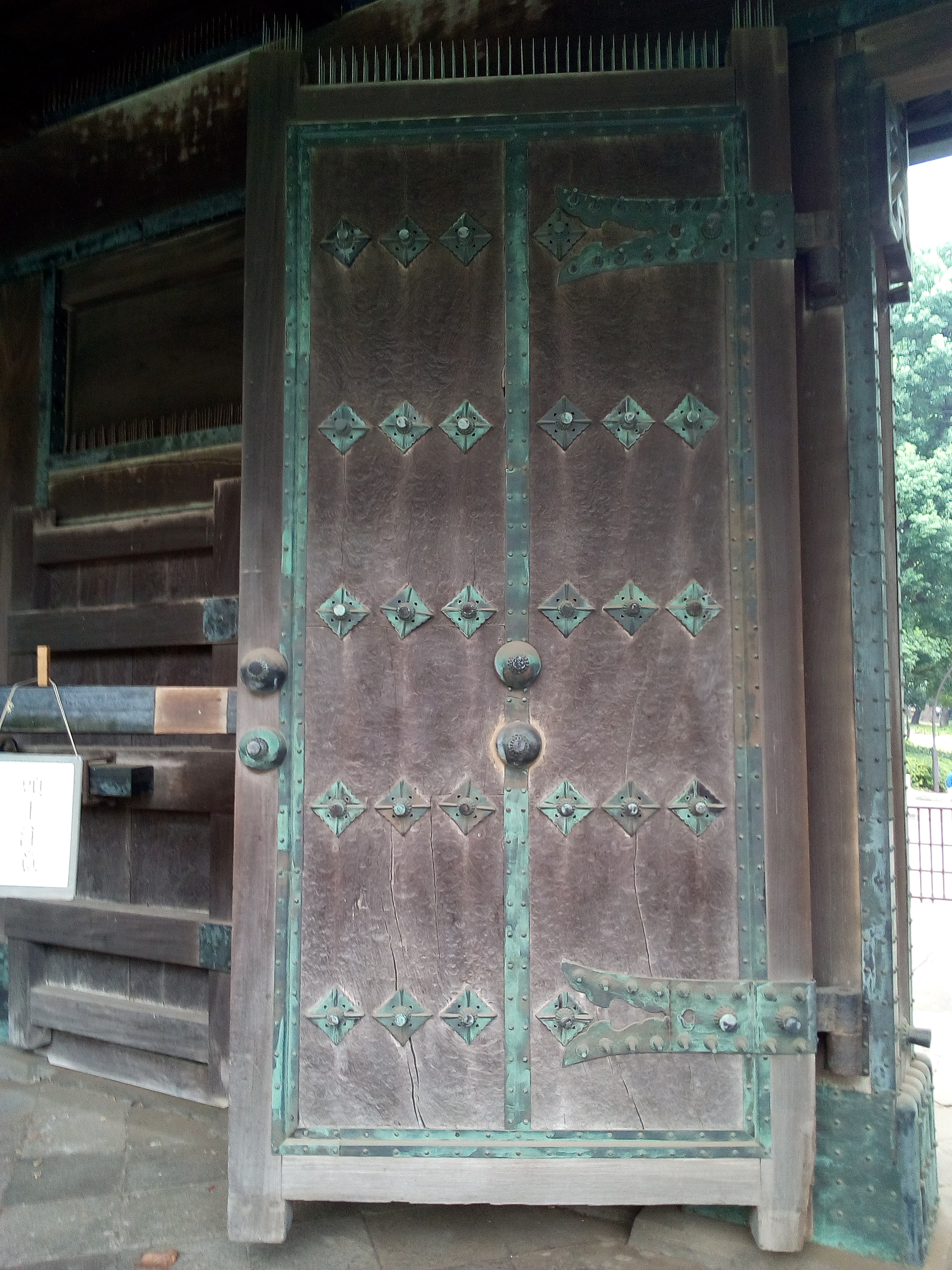

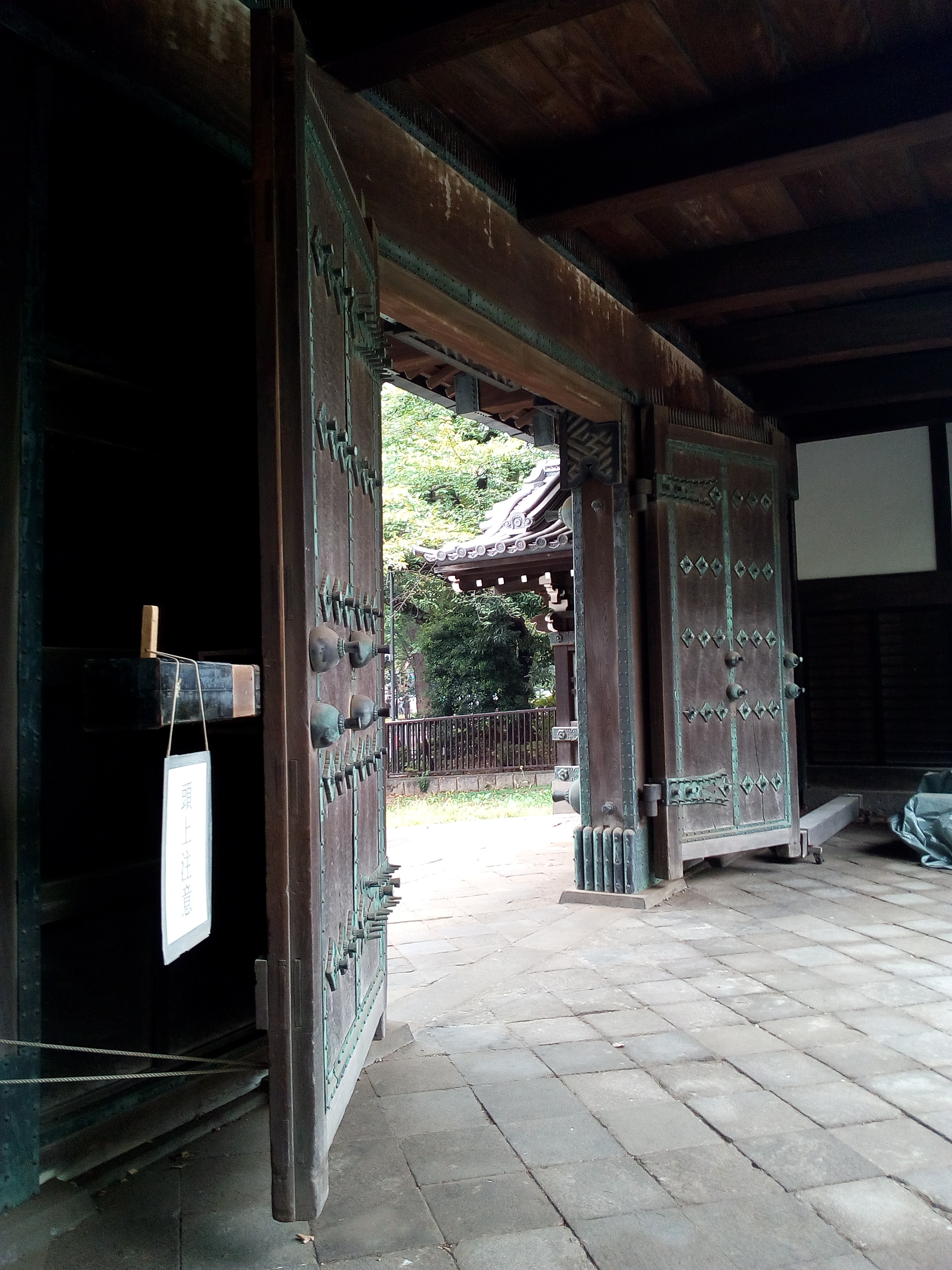

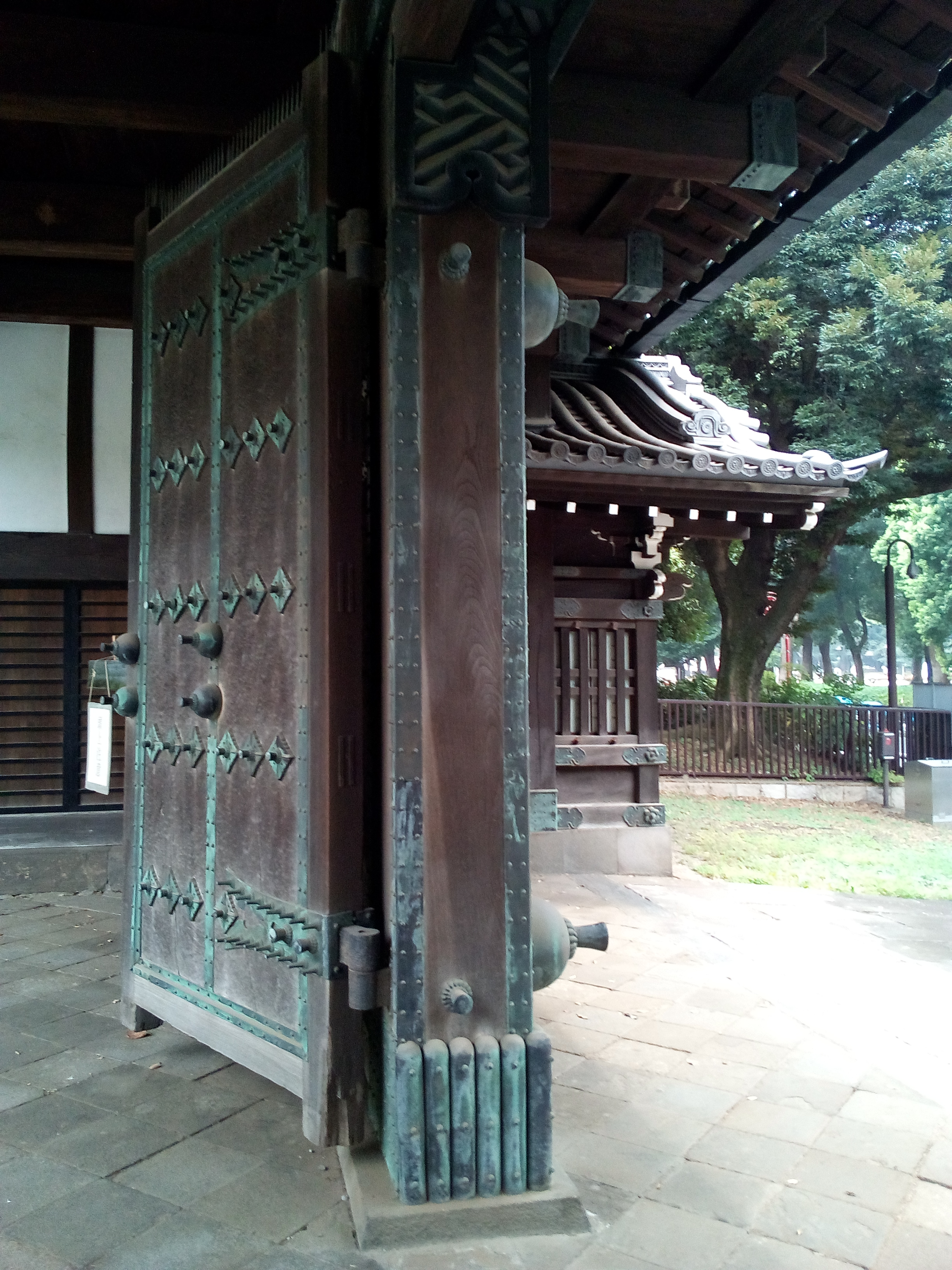

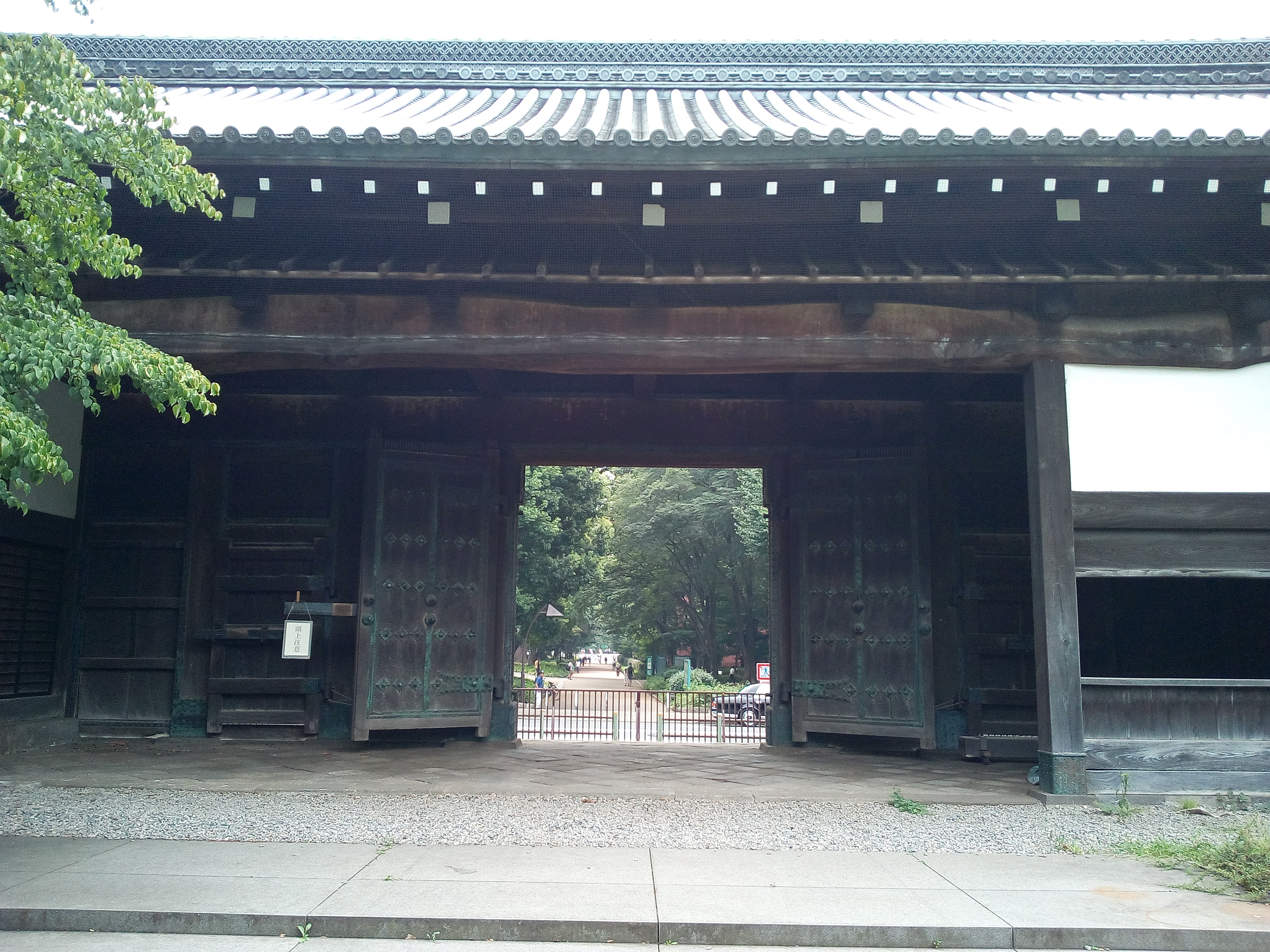
