= Black Gate (manga) =

Japanese manga by Yukiko Sumiyoshi

- English edition of Black Gate, written and illustrated by Yukiko Sumiyoshi as published by Tokyopop.

リバース/エンド (Ribāsu / Endo)
- Genre: Drama, Fantasy
- Manga
- Written by: Yukiko Sumiyoshi
- Published by: Enterbrain
- English publisher: AUS: Madman Entertainment; NA: Tokyopop
- Magazine: Comic B's-Log
- Original run: March 1, 2007 – May 1, 2008
- Volumes: 3

Black Gate (Japanese: リバース/エンド, Hepburn: Ribāsu/Endo; lit. "Reverse/End"), is a Japanese manga written and illustrated by Yukiko Sumiyoshi. The manga was serialized in Enterbrain's manga magazine Comic B's-Log. The individual chapters were collected into three bound volumes, which were published by Enterbrain between March 1, 2007, and May 1, 2008. It was licensed in English by Tokyopop, which released the manga as an omnibus on October 12, 2010. The manga is also licensed Australasia by Madman Entertainment and in Taiwan by Tong Li Publishing.

== Reception ==
Anime News Network's Lissa Patillo commends the manga for its "easy to understand plot that takes time to focus on compelling cast of secondary character; attractive artwork", but criticizes it for a "weak opening volume; Hijiri doesn't make for a strong main character and the ending leaves something to be desired". Anime News Network's Carlo Santos commends the manga for its promising start but then criticizes the manga for using deus ex machina in the grand finale. The Manga Critic's Katherine Dacey heavily pans the manga as being "bland" and that the story "feels like a clip-and-paste job, borrowing elements from more popular series and reassembling them into a less entertaining copy." Sequential Tart's Karen Maeda lightly criticizes the manga with "the art is a little bit rough and could use some more detail, but it's pretty easy to follow. The dialog also follows about in the same way as the art, but it's pretty easy to understand the plot and what is going on." Comic Book Bin's Chris Zimmerman comments on the plot of the manga with "the pacing of the series feels off kilter for the first third of the volume, with the main plot seemingly heading nowhere. This changes when the focus shifts to Hijiri and for that reason, the omnibus format actually enhances the readability of the series as a whole. Had the volumes been published individually, the first volume's lack of story progression and overly repetitive nature could have possibly driven readers away before the series had a chance to kick into high gear. As it stands, the omnibus format makes Black Gate more accessible.
