= Man Yue =

Chinese-based manufacturer of capacitors

Man Yue Technology Holdings Limited
- Native name: 萬裕科技集團有限公司
- Traded as: SEHK: 894
- Industry: Electronics
- Founded: 1979; 47 years ago, Shenzhen, China
- Headquarters: Hong Kong, China
- Products: Capacitors; Electronic components
- Number of employees: 3,900
- Website: Official website

Man Yue Technology Holdings Limited is a Chinese manufacturer of capacitors, founded in 1979 and listed in the Hong Kong Stock Exchange since 1997.

It markets its products under different brands, including SAMXON, X-CON, XLPC, and ANGA POW.
