= Capacitor plague =

Period of high failure rate of capacitors

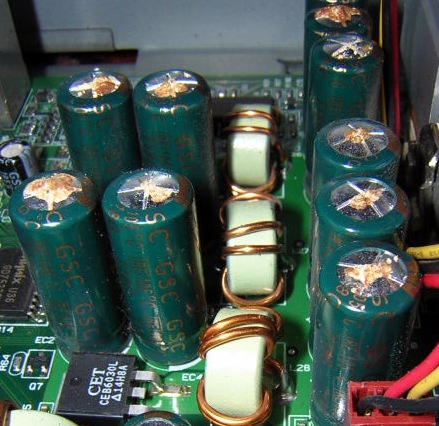
Failed aluminium electrolytic capacitors with open vents in the top of the can, and visible dried electrolyte residue (reddish-brown color)

The capacitor plague was a problem related to a higher-than-expected failure rate of non-solid aluminium electrolytic capacitors between 1999 and 2007, especially those from some Taiwanese manufacturers, due to faulty electrolyte composition that caused corrosion accompanied by gas generation; this often resulted in rupturing of the case of the capacitor from the build-up of pressure.

High failure rates occurred in many well-known brands of electronics, and were particularly evident in motherboards, video cards, and power supplies of personal computers.

A 2003 article in The Independent attributed the problem to an incorrectly copied electrolyte formula. According to the article, an unnamed scientist left Japan’s Rubycon Corporation in 2001, taking his knowledge of the company's secret formula to Luminous Town Electric in China. Later that year, members of his team at Luminous defected to Taiwan, taking the incorrectly copied formula with them.

== History ==
=== First announcements ===
The first flawed capacitors linked to Taiwanese raw material problems were reported by the specialist magazine Passive Component Industry in September 2002. Shortly thereafter, two mainstream electronics journals reported the discovery of widespread prematurely failing capacitors, from Taiwanese manufacturers, in motherboards.

These publications informed engineers and other technically interested specialists, but the issue did not receive widespread public exposure until Carey Holzman published his experiences about "leaking capacitors" in the overclocking performance community.

=== Public attention ===
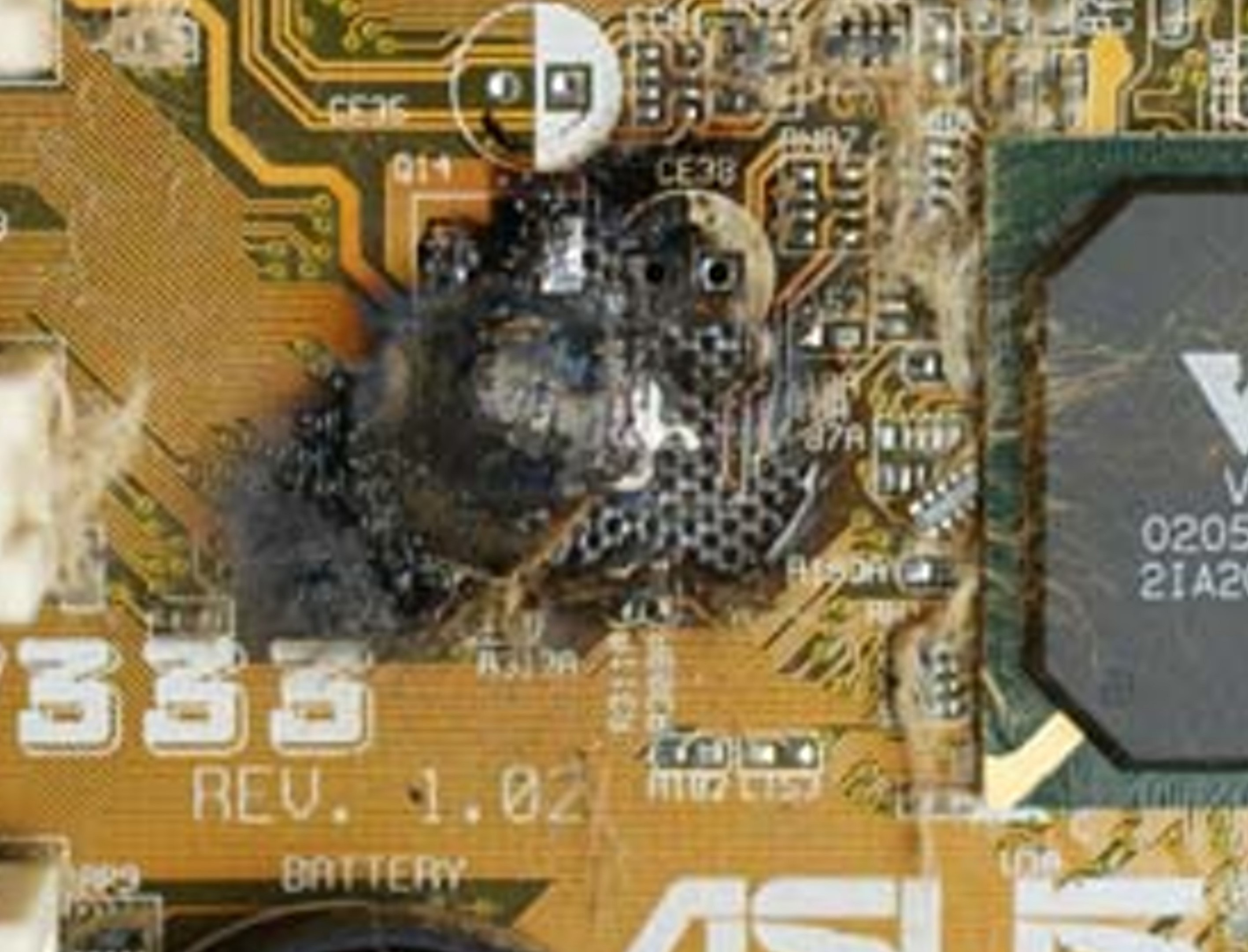
Results of fire on a printed circuit board, caused by leaked electrolyte which short-circuited conductors carrying power

The news from the Holzman publication spread quickly on the Internet and in newspapers, partly due to the spectacular images of the failures – bulging or burst capacitors, expelled sealing rubber and leaking electrolyte on countless circuit boards. Many PC users were affected, and caused an avalanche of reports and comments on thousands of blogs and other web communities.

The quick spread of the news also resulted in many misinformed users and blogs posting pictures of capacitors that had failed due to reasons other than faulty electrolyte.

=== Prevalence ===
Most of the affected capacitors were produced from 1999 to 2003 and failed between 2002 and 2005. Problems with capacitors produced with an incorrectly formulated electrolyte have affected equipment manufactured up to at least 2007.

Major vendors of motherboards such as Abit, IBM, Dell, Apple, HP, and Intel were affected by capacitors with faulty electrolytes.

In 2005, Dell spent some US$420 million replacing motherboards outright and on the logistics of determining whether a system was in need of replacement.

Many other equipment manufacturers unknowingly assembled and sold boards with faulty capacitors, and as a result the effect of the capacitor plague could be seen in all kinds of devices worldwide.

Because not all manufacturers had offered recalls or repairs, do it yourself repair instructions were written and published on the Internet.

=== Responsibility ===
In the November/December 2002 issue of Passive Component Industry, following its initial story about defective electrolyte, reported that some large Taiwanese manufacturers of electrolytic capacitors were denying responsibility for defective products.

While industrial customers confirmed the failures, they were not able to trace the source of the faulty components. The defective capacitors were marked with previously unknown brands, including Tayeh, Choyo, and Chhsi. The marks were not easily linked to familiar companies or product brands.

The motherboard manufacturer ABIT Computer Corp. was the only affected manufacturer that publicly admitted to defective capacitors obtained from Taiwan capacitor makers being used in its products. However, the company would not reveal the name of the capacitor maker that supplied the faulty products.

== Symptoms ==
=== Common characteristics ===
The non-solid aluminium electrolytic capacitors with improperly formulated electrolyte mostly belonged to the so-called "low equivalent series resistance (ESR)", "low impedance", or "high ripple current" e-cap series. The advantage of e-caps using an electrolyte composed of 70% water or more is, in particular, a low ESR, which allows a higher ripple current, and decreased production costs, water being the least costly material in a capacitor.

Comparison of aluminium e-caps with different non-solid electrolytes
Electrolyte	Manufacturer series, type	Dimensions D × L (mm)	Max. ESR at 100 kHz, 20 °C (mΩ)	Max. ripple current at 85/105 °C (mA)
Non-solid organic electrolyte	Vishay; 036 RSP, 100 μF, 10 V	5 × 11	1000	160
Non-solid, ethylene-glycol, boric-acid (borax) electrolyte	NCC; SMQ, 100 μF, 10 V	5 × 11	900	180
Non-solid water-based electrolyte	Rubycon; ZL, 100 μF, 10 V	5 × 11	300	250

=== Premature failure ===
All electrolytic capacitors with non-solid electrolyte age over time, due to evaporation of the electrolyte. The capacitance usually decreases and the ESR usually increases. The normal lifespan of a non-solid electrolytic capacitor of consumer quality, typically rated at 2000 h/85 °C and operating at 40 °C, is roughly 6 years. It can be more than 10 years for a 1000 h/105 °C capacitor operating at 40 °C. Electrolytic capacitors that operate at a lower temperature can have a considerably longer lifespan.

The capacitance should normally degrade to as low as 70% of the rated value, and the ESR increase to twice the rated value, over the normal life span of the component, before it should be considered as a "degradation failure". The life of an electrolytic capacitor with defective electrolyte can be as little as two years. The capacitor may fail prematurely after reaching approximately 30% to 50% of its expected lifetime.

=== Electrical symptoms ===
The electrical characteristics of a failed electrolytic capacitor with an open vent are the following:

- capacitance value decreases to below the rated value
- ESR increases to very high values.

Electrolytic capacitors with an open vent are in the process of drying out, regardless of whether they have good or bad electrolyte. They always show low capacitance values and very high ohmic ESR values. Dry e-caps are therefore electrically useless.

E-caps can fail without any visible symptoms. Since the electrical characteristics of electrolytic capacitors are the reason for their use, these parameters must be tested with instruments to definitively decide if the devices have failed. But even if the electrical parameters are out of their specifications, the assignment of failure to the electrolyte problem is not a certainty.

Non-solid aluminium electrolytic capacitors without visible symptoms, which have improperly formulated electrolyte, typically show two electrical symptoms:

- relatively high and fluctuating leakage current
- increased capacitance value, up to twice the rated value, which fluctuates after heating and cooling of the capacitor body

=== Visible symptoms ===
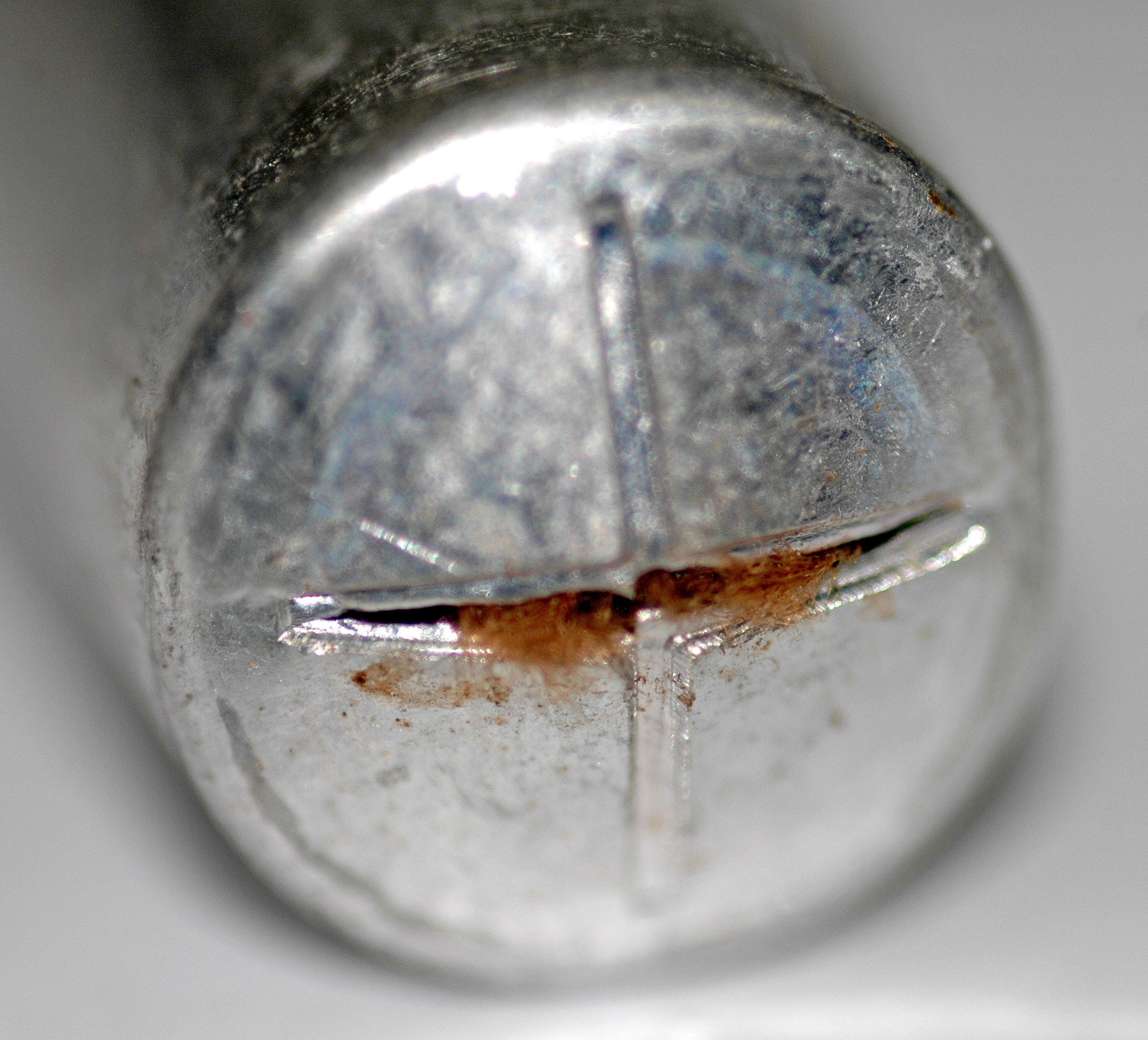
Closeup of a broken electrolytic capacitor vent and dried electrolyte residue

When examining a failed electronic device, the failed capacitors can easily be recognized by clearly visible symptoms that include the following:

- Bulging of the vent on top of the capacitor. (The "vent" is stamped into the top of the casing of a can-shaped capacitor, forming a seam that is meant to split to relieve pressure build-up inside, preventing an explosion.) This bulging is colloquially known as a pregnant capacitor.
- Ruptured or cracked vent, often accompanied by visible crusty rust-like brown or red dried electrolyte deposits.
- Capacitor casing sitting crooked on the circuit board, caused by the bottom rubber plug being pushed out, sometimes with electrolyte having leaked onto the motherboard from the base of the capacitor, visible as dark-brown or black surface deposits on the PCB. The leaked electrolyte can be confused with thick elastic glue sometimes used to secure the capacitors against shock. A dark brown or black crust up the side of a capacitor is invariably glue, not electrolyte. The glue itself is harmless.
Visible symptoms of failed electrolytic capacitors
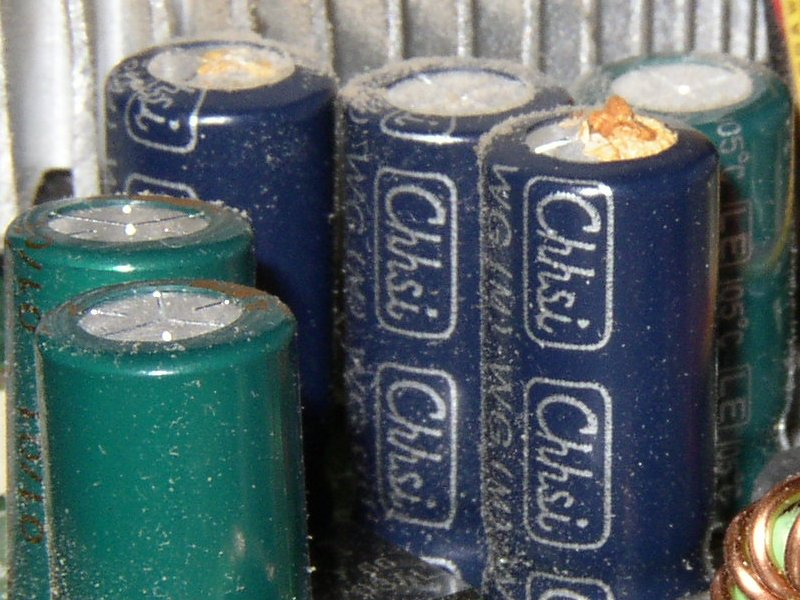
Failed Chhsi capacitor with crusty electrolyte buildup on the top

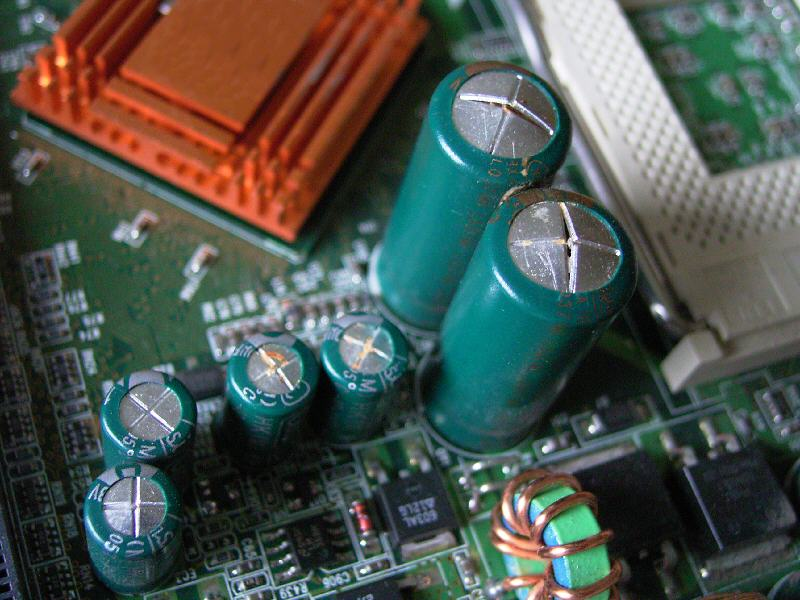
Failed capacitors next to CPU motherboard socket

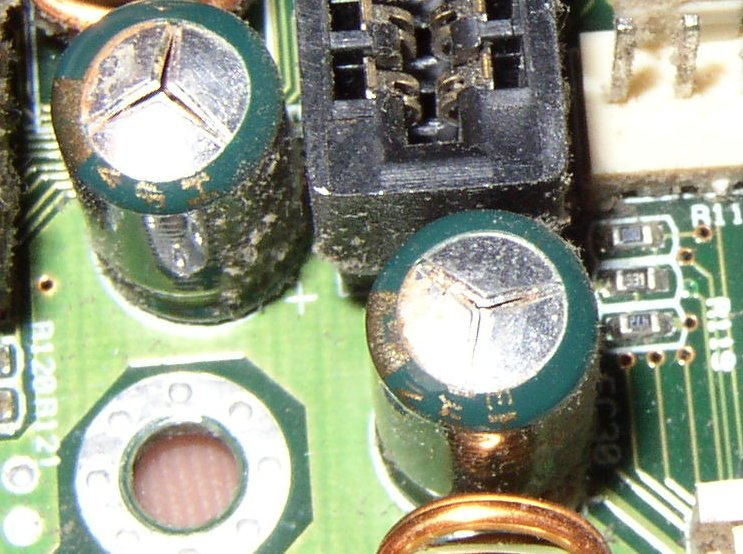
Failed Tayeh capacitors which have vented subtly through their aluminium tops

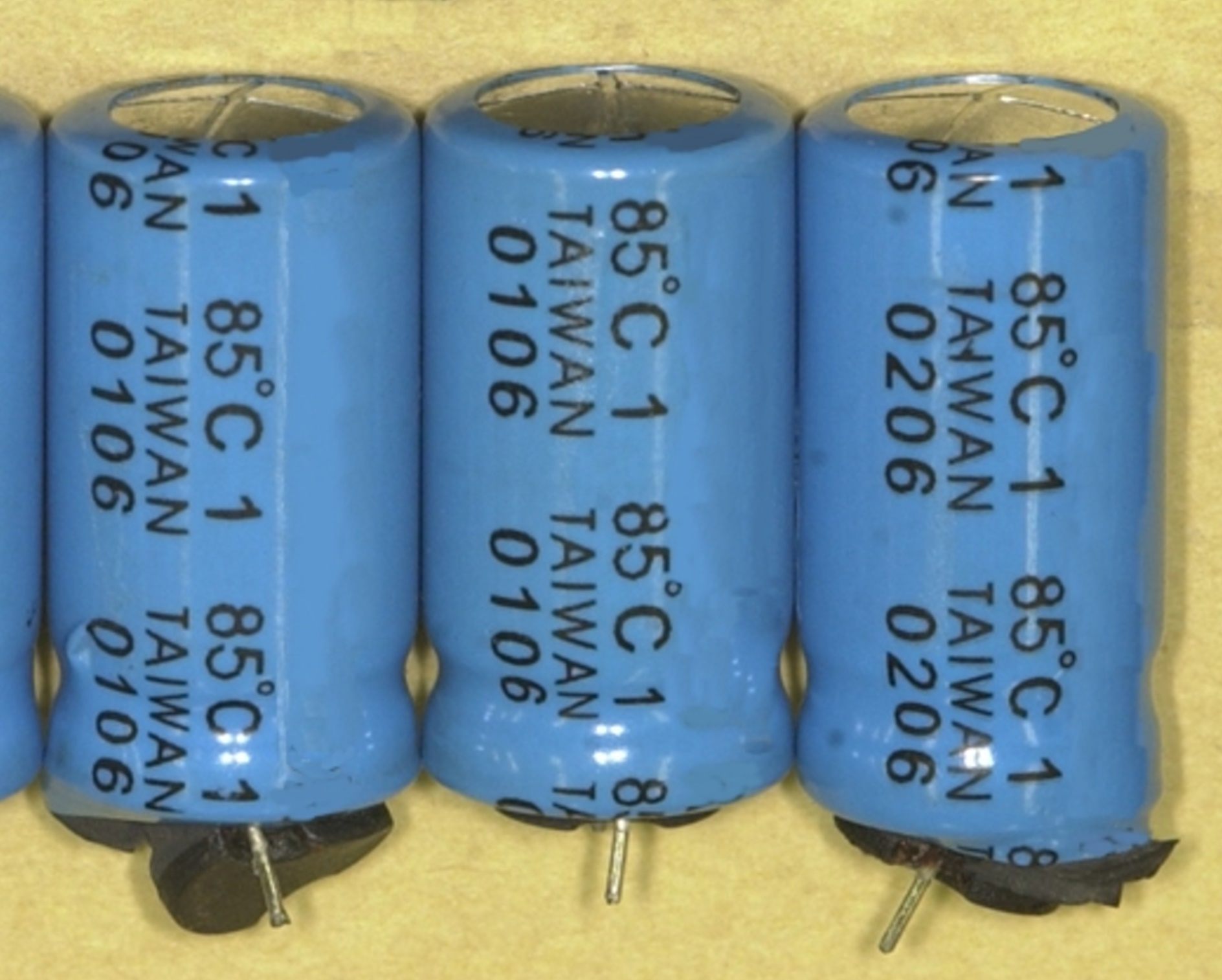
Failed electrolytic capacitors with swollen can tops and expelled rubber seals, dates of manufacture "0106" and "0206" (January and February 2006)

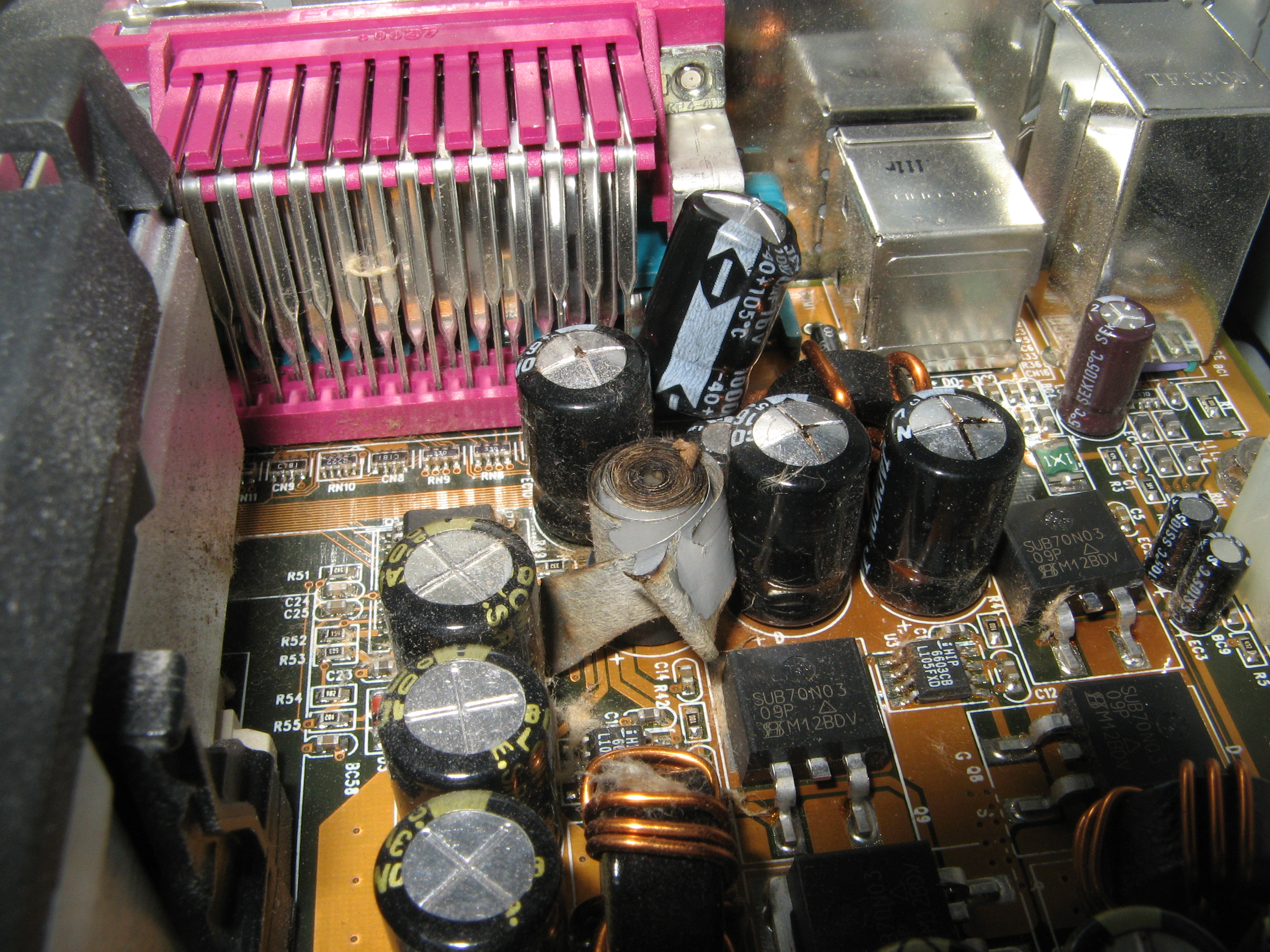
Failed capacitor has exploded and exposed internal elements, and another has partially blown off its casing

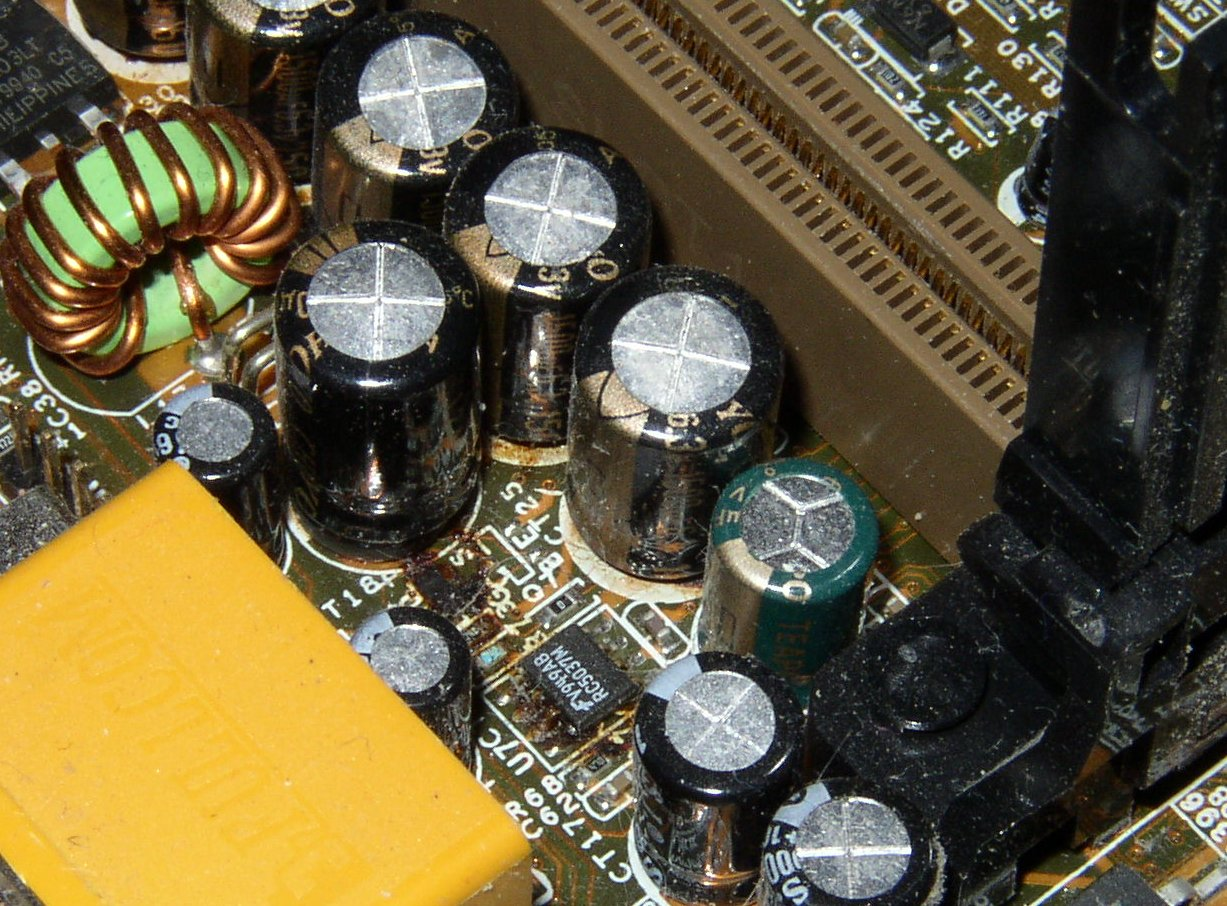
Failed Choyo capacitors (black color) which have leaked brownish electrolyte onto the motherboard

== Investigation ==
=== Industrial espionage ===
Reports linked the capacitor plague to industrial espionage involving the theft of a proprietary electrolyte formula. According to these accounts, a materials scientist left Japan's Rubycon Corporation, taking his knowledge of the company's proprietary water-based electrolyte to Luminous Town Electric in China. Later that year, members of his team at Luminous defected to Taiwan, taking the incorrectly copied formula with them. In Taiwan, they sold the formula to several capacitor manufacturers, who would later undercut the prices of the Japanese manufacturers.

As detailed below, the copied electrolyte formula lacked proprietary ingredients needed to keep it stable over time. Laboratory analyses of failed capacitors found high water content and insufficient stabilizing compounds, which allowed chemical reactions to produce hydrogen gas inside the capacitors, leading to their failure.

=== Incomplete electrolyte formula ===
Unimpeded formation of hydroxide (hydration) and associated hydrogen gas production, occurring during "capacitor plague" or "bad capacitors" incidents involving the failure of large numbers of aluminium electrolytic capacitors, has been demonstrated by two researchers at the Center for Advanced Life Cycle Engineering of the University of Maryland who analyzed the failed capacitors.

The two scientists initially determined, by ion chromatography and mass spectrometry, that there was hydrogen gas present in failed capacitors, leading to bulging of the capacitor's case or bursting of the vent. Thus it was proved that the oxidation takes place in accordance with the first step of aluminium oxide formation.

Because it has been customary in electrolytic capacitors to bind the excess hydrogen by using reducing or depolarizing compounds, such as aromatic nitrogen compounds or amines, to relieve the resulting pressure, the researchers then searched for compounds of this type. Although the analysis methods were very sensitive in detecting such pressure-relieving compounds, no traces of such agents were found within the failed capacitors.

In capacitors in which the internal pressure build-up was so great that the capacitor case was already bulging but the vent had not opened yet, the pH value of the electrolyte could be measured. The electrolyte of the faulty Taiwanese capacitors was alkaline, with a pH of between 7 and 8. Good comparable Japanese capacitors had an electrolyte that was acidic, with a pH of around 4. As it is known that aluminium can be dissolved by alkaline liquids, but not that which is mildly acidic, an energy-dispersive X-ray spectroscopy (EDX or EDS) fingerprint analysis of the electrolyte of the faulty capacitors was made, which detected dissolved aluminium in the electrolyte.

To protect the metallic aluminium against the aggressiveness of the water, some phosphate compounds, known as inhibitors or passivators, can be used to produce long-term stable capacitors with high-aqueous electrolytes. Phosphate compounds are mentioned in patents regarding electrolytic capacitors with aqueous electrolytic systems. Since phosphate ions were missing and the electrolyte was also alkaline in the investigated Taiwanese electrolytes, the capacitor evidently lacked any protection against water damage, and the formation of more-stable alumina oxides was inhibited. Therefore, only aluminium hydroxide was generated.

The results of chemical analysis were confirmed by measuring electrical capacitance and leakage current in a long-term test lasting 56 days. Due to the chemical corrosion, the oxide layer of these capacitors had been weakened, so after a short time the capacitance and the leakage current increased briefly, before dropping abruptly when gas pressure opened the vent. The report of Hillman and Helmold proved that the cause of the failed capacitors was a faulty electrolyte mixture used by the Taiwanese manufacturers, which lacked the necessary chemical ingredients to ensure the correct pH of the electrolyte over time, for long-term stability of the electrolytic capacitors. Their further conclusion, that the electrolyte with its alkaline pH value had the fatal flaw of a continual buildup of hydroxide without its being converted into the stable oxide, was verified on the surface of the anode foil both photographically and with an EDX-fingerprint analysis of the chemical components.

== See also ==
- RKM code
