= Rubycon Corporation =

Japanese electronics company

- Native name: ルビコン株式会社
- Type: Private KK
- Industry: Electronics
- Founded: (April 28, 1952; 74 years ago)
- Headquarters: Nishi-Minowa, Ina City, Nagano Prefecture 399-4593, Japan
- Key people: Hiroaki Akahane (President and CEO)
- Products: Capacitors; Switching power supply units
- Revenue: ▲JPY 44.27 billion (FY 2020)
- Number of employees: 2,734 (consolidated)
- Website: www.rubycon.co.jp

Rubycon Corporation (ルビコン株式会社, Rubikon Kabushiki-gaisha) is a Japanese electronics company.

== History ==
Founded in 1952 as Nihon Denkai Seisakusho (有限会社日本電解製作所), the company changed its name to Shin-Ei Electronics Inc. (信英電子株式会社) in 1960. It was formerly known as Seibu Shin-Ei Inc. and changed its name to Rubycon Corporation in December 1990.

In 2010, Rubycon appointed Supreme Components International, a Singapore-based electronics distributor, as their franchised distributor.

== Products ==
Rubycon's main products are electrolytic capacitors, film capacitors and power supply units with a wide range of applications including consumer, industrial, power, lighting and automotive.

Rubycon holds a significant world market share in the capacitor market, and has 11 production sites – 10 in Japan and one in Indonesia.

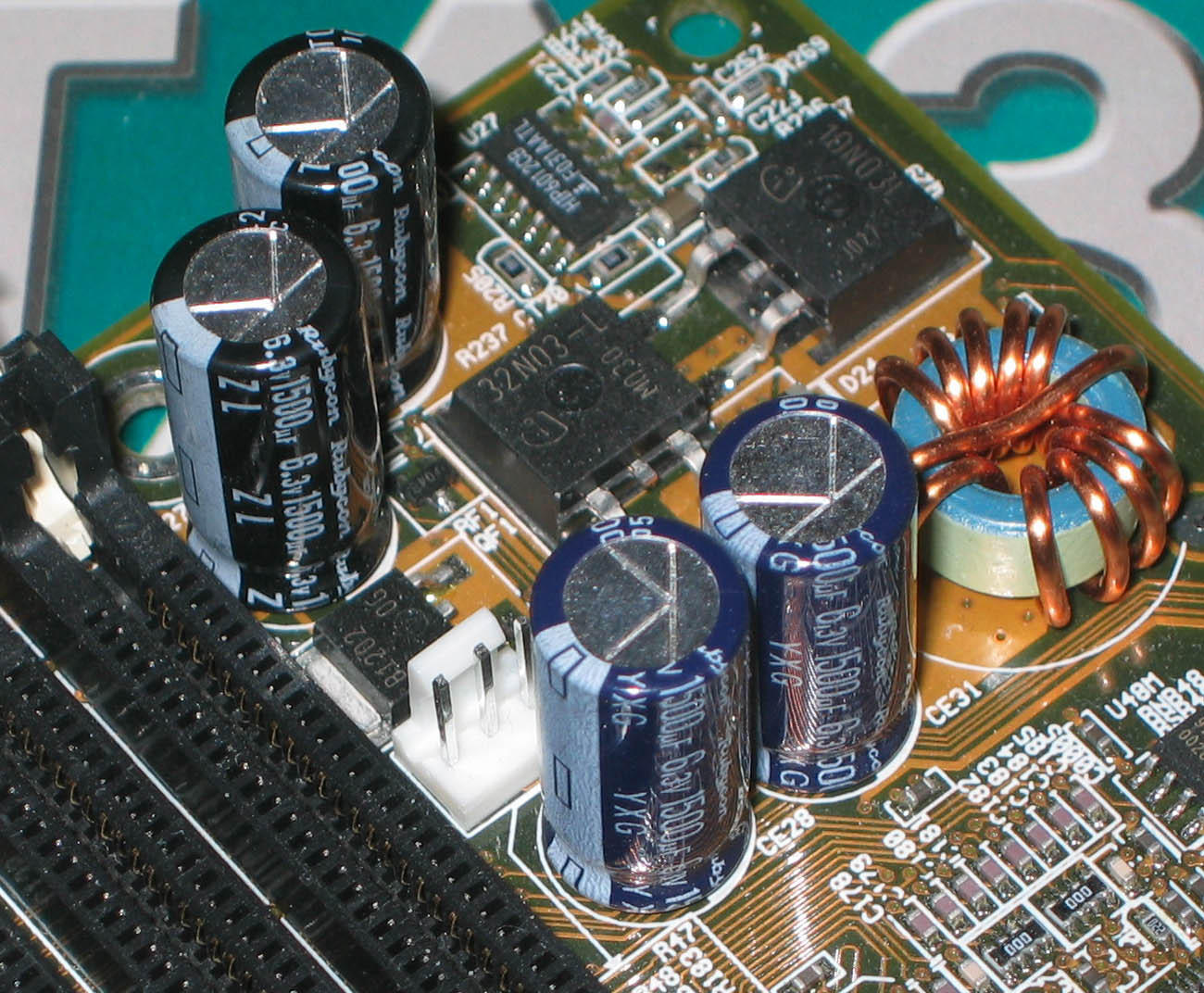
Four Rubycon capacitors on a motherboard

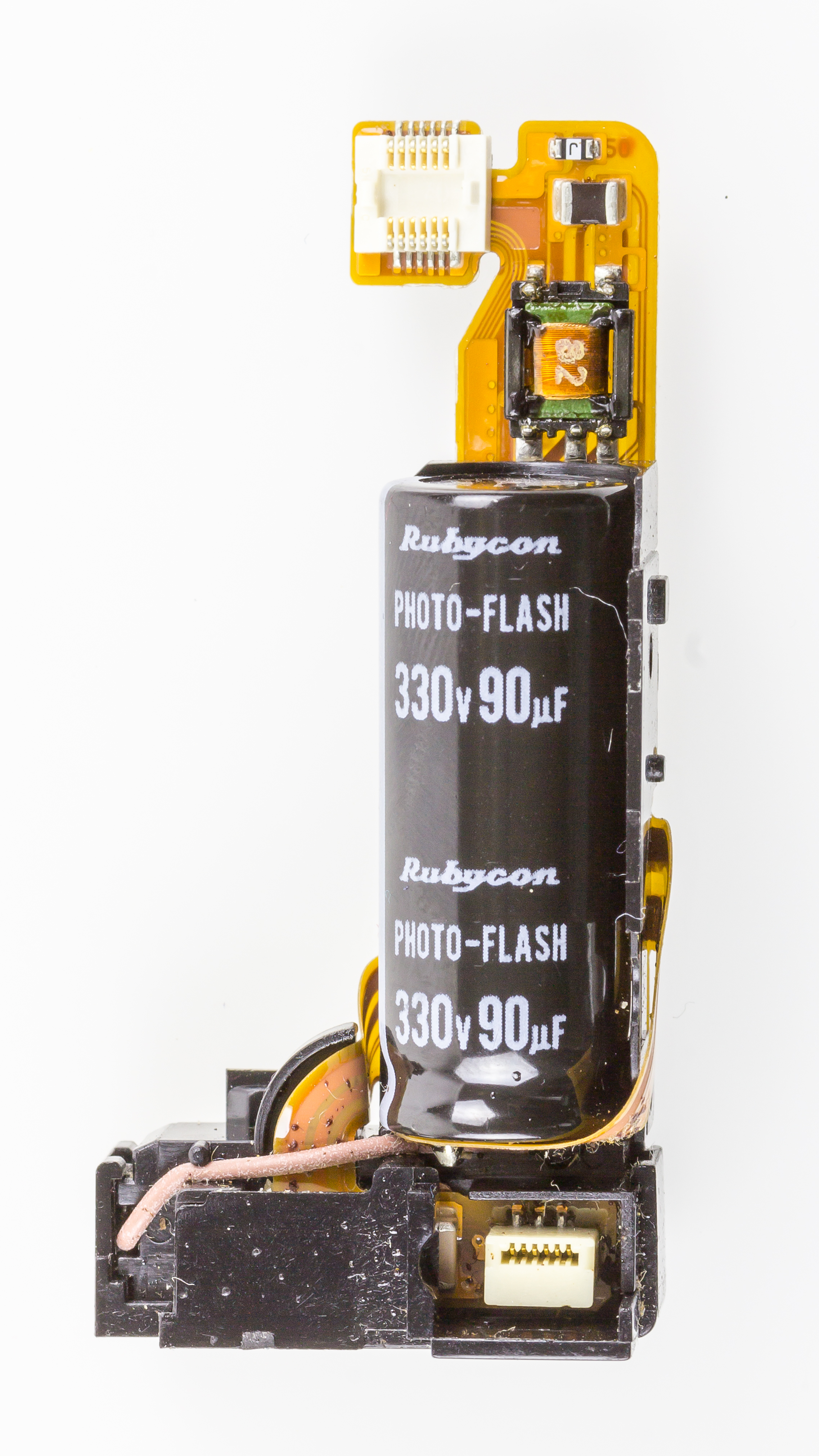
A Rubycon made capacitor for a photo flash
