= Pseudocapacitance =

Storage of electricity within an electrochemical cell

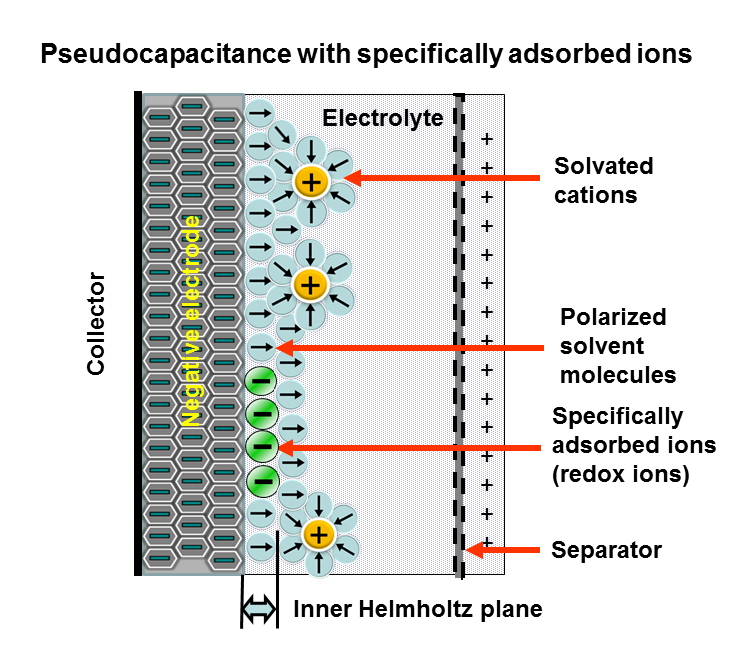
Simplified view of a double-layer with specifically adsorbed ions which have submitted their charge to the electrode to explain the faradaic charge-transfer of the pseudocapacitance.

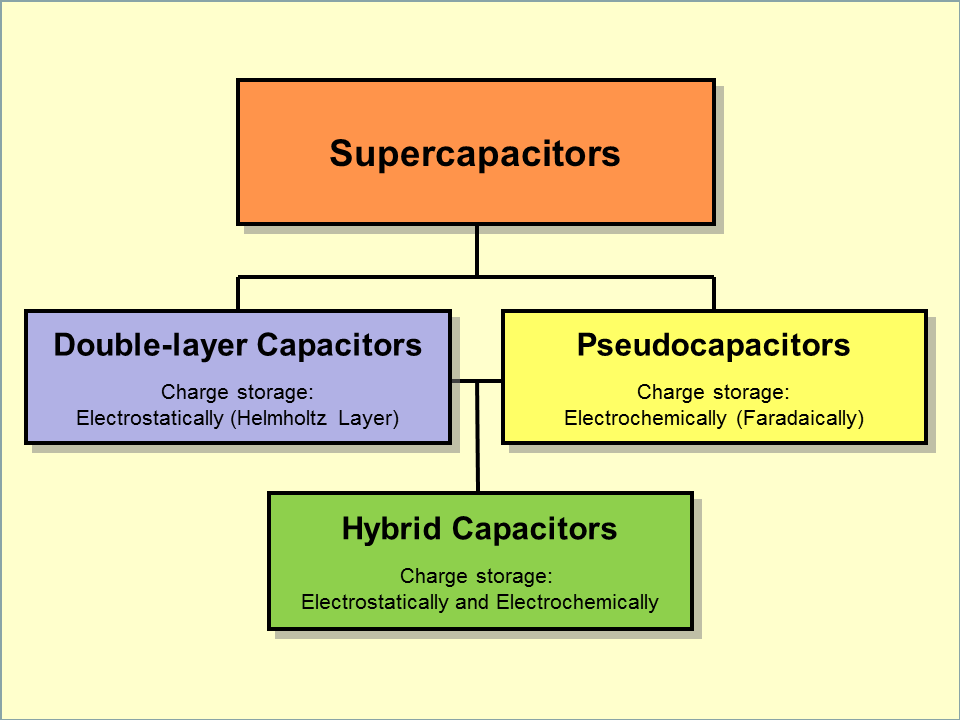
Hierarchical classification of supercapacitors and related types

Pseudocapacitance is the electrochemical storage of electricity in an electrochemical capacitor that occurs due to faradaic charge transfer originating from a very fast sequence of reversible faradaic redox, electrosorption or intercalation processes on the surface of suitable electrodes. Pseudocapacitance is accompanied by an electron charge-transfer between electrolyte and electrode coming from a de-solvated and adsorbed ion. One electron per charge unit is involved. The adsorbed ion has no chemical reaction with the atoms of the electrode (no chemical bonds arise) since only a charge-transfer takes place. Supercapacitors that rely primarily on pseudocapacitance are sometimes called pseudocapacitors.

Faradaic pseudocapacitance only occurs together with static double-layer capacitance. Pseudocapacitance and double-layer capacitance both contribute inseparably to the total capacitance value. The amount of pseudocapacitance depends on the surface area, material and structure of the electrodes. Pseudocapacitance may contribute more capacitance than double-layer capacitance for the same surface area by 100x.

The amount of electric charge stored in a pseudocapacitance is linearly proportional to the applied voltage. The unit of pseudocapacitance is farad.

== History ==
- Development of the double layer and pseudocapacitance model see Double layer (interfacial)
- Development of the electrochemical components see Supercapacitors

== Redox reactions ==
=== Differences ===
==== Rechargeable batteries ====
Redox reactions in batteries with faradaic charge-transfer between an electrolyte and the surface of an electrode were characterized decades ago. These chemical processes are associated with chemical reactions of the electrode materials usually with attendant phase changes. Although these chemical processes are relatively reversible, battery charge/discharge cycles often irreversibly produce unreversed chemical reaction products of the reagents. Accordingly, the cycle-life of rechargeable batteries is usually limited. Further, the reaction products lower power density. Additionally, the chemical processes are relatively slow, extending charge/discharge times.

==== Electro-chemical capacitors ====
Schematic representation of a double layer on an electrode (BMD) model. 1. Inner Helmholtz plane, (IHP), 2. Outer Helmholtz plane (OHP), 3. Diffuse layer, 4. Solvated electrolyte ions (cations) 5. Specifically adsorbed ions (redox ion, which contributes to the pseudocapacitance), 6. Molecules of the solvent

A fundamental difference between redox reactions in batteries and in electrochemical capacitors (supercapacitors) is that in the latter, the reactions are a very fast sequence of reversible processes with electron transfer without any phase changes of the electrode molecules. They do not involve making or breaking chemical bonds. The de-solvated atoms or ions contributing the pseudocapacitance simply cling to the atomic structure of the electrode and charges are distributed on surfaces by physical adsorption processes. Compared with batteries, supercapacitor faradaic processes are much faster and more stable over time, because they leave only traces of reaction products. Despite the reduced amount of these products, they cause capacitance degradation. This behavior is the essence of pseudocapacitance.

Pseudocapacitive processes lead to a charge-dependent, linear capacitive behavior, as well as the accomplishment of non-faradaic double-layer capacitance in contrast to batteries, which have a nearly charge-independent behavior. The amount of pseudocapacitance depends on the surface area, material and structure of the electrodes. The pseudocapacitance may exceed the value of double-layer capacitance for the same surface area by 100x.

== Capacitance functionality ==
Intercalated metal atoms between planar graphite layers

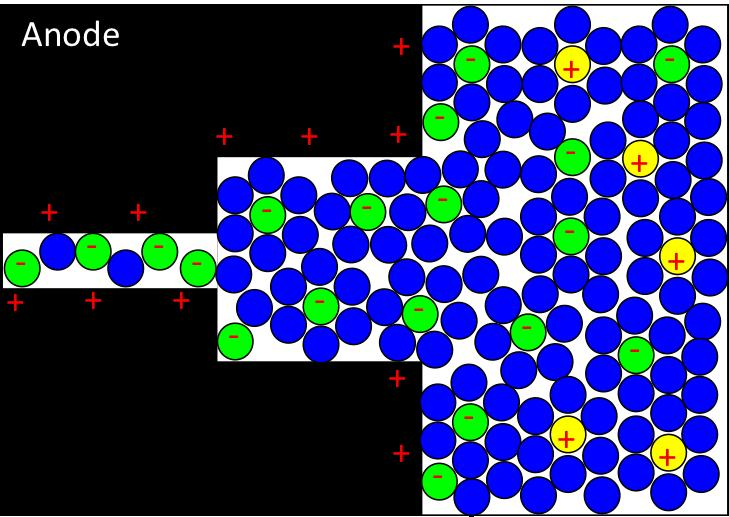
Confinement of solvated ions in pores, such as those present in carbide-derived carbon (CDC). As the pore size approaches the size of the solvation shell, the solvent molecules are removed, resulting in larger ionic packing density and increased charge storage capability.

Applying a voltage at the capacitor terminals moves the polarized ions or charged atoms in the electrolyte to the opposite polarized electrode. Between the surfaces of the electrodes and the adjacent electrolyte an electric double-layer forms. One layer of ions on the electrode surface and the second layer of adjacent polarized and solvated ions in the electrolyte move to the opposite polarized electrode. The two ion layers are separated by a single layer of electrolyte molecules. Between the two layers, a static electric field forms that results in double-layer capacitance. Accompanied by the electric double-layer, some de-solvated electrolyte ions pervade the separating solvent layer and are adsorbed by the electrode's surface atoms. They are specifically adsorbed and deliver their charge to the electrode. In other words, the ions in the electrolyte within the Helmholtz double-layer also act as electron donors and transfer electrons to the electrode atoms, resulting in a faradaic current. This faradaic charge transfer, originated by a fast sequence of reversible redox reactions, electrosorptions or intercalation processes between electrolyte and the electrode surface is called pseudocapacitance.

Depending on the electrode's structure or surface material, pseudocapacitance can originate when specifically adsorbed ions pervade the double-layer, proceeding in several one-electron stages. The electrons involved in the faradaic processes are transferred to or from the electrode's valence-electron states (orbitals) and flow through the external circuit to the opposite electrode where a second double-layer with an equal number of opposite-charged ions forms. The electrons remain in the strongly ionized and electrode surface's "electron hungry" transition-metal ions and are not transferred to the adsorbed ions. This kind of pseudocapacitance has a linear function within narrow limits and is determined by the potential-dependent degree of surface coverage of the adsorbed anions. The storage capacity of the pseudocapacitance is limited by the finite quantity of reagent or of available surface.

Systems that give rise to pseudocapacitance:

- Redox system: Ox + ze‾ ⇌ Red
- Intercalation system: Li^{+} in "Ma_{2}"
- Electrosorption, underpotential deposition of metal adatoms or H: M^{+} + ze‾ + S ⇌ SM or H^{+} + e‾ + S ⇌ SH (S = surface lattice sites)

All three types of electrochemical processes have appeared in supercapacitors.

When discharging pseudocapacitance, the charge transfer is reversed and the ions or atoms leave the double-layer and spread throughout the electrolyte.

=== Materials ===
Electrodes' ability to produce pseudocapacitance strongly depends on the electrode materials' chemical affinity to the ions adsorbed on the electrode surface as well as on the electrode pore structure and dimension. Materials exhibiting redox behavior for use as pseudocapacitor electrodes are transition-metal oxides inserted by doping in the conductive electrode material such as active carbon, as well as conducting polymers such as polyaniline or derivatives of polythiophene covering the electrode material.

==== Transition metal oxides/sulfides ====
These materials provide high pseudocapacitance and were thoroughly studied by Conway. Many oxides of transition metals like ruthenium (RuO_{2}), iridium (IrO_{2}), iron (Fe_{3}O_{4}), manganese (MnO_{2}) or sulfides such as titanium sulfide (TiS_{2}) or their combinations generate faradaic electron–transferring reactions with low conducting resistance.

Ruthenium dioxide (RuO_{2}) in combination with sulfuric acid (H_{2}SO_{4}) electrolyte provides one of the best examples of pseudocapacitance, with a charge/discharge over a window of about 1.2 V per electrode. Furthermore, the reversibility on these transition metal electrodes is excellent, with a cycle life of more than several hundred-thousand cycles. Pseudocapacitance originates from a coupled, reversible redox reaction with several oxidation steps with overlapping potential. The electrons mostly come from the electrode's valence orbitals. The electron transfer reaction is very fast and can be accompanied with high currents.

The electron transfer reaction takes place according to:

RuO_{2} + xH^{+} + xe^{−} ⇌ RuO_{2−x}(OH)_{x} where 0 < x < 2

During charge and discharge, H^{+} (protons) are incorporated into or removed from the RuO_{2} crystal lattice, which generates storage of electrical energy without chemical transformation. The OH groups are deposited as a molecular layer on the electrode surface and remain in the region of the Helmholtz layer. Since the measurable voltage from the redox reaction is proportional to the charged state, the reaction behaves like a capacitor rather than a battery, whose voltage is largely independent of the state of charge.

==== Conducting polymers ====
Another type of material with a high amount of pseudocapacitance is electron-conducting polymers. Conductive polymer such as polyaniline, polythiophene, polypyrrole and polyacetylene have a lower reversibility of the redox processes involving faradaic charge transfer than transition metal oxides, and suffer from a limited stability during cycling. Such electrodes employ electrochemical doping or dedoping of the polymers with anions and cations. Highest capacitance and power density are achieved with a n/p-type polymer configuration, with one negatively charged (n-doped) and one positively charged (p-doped) electrode.

=== Structure ===
Pseudocapacitance may originate from the electrode structure, especially from the material pore size. The use of carbide-derived carbons (CDCs) or carbon nanotubes (CNTs) as electrodes provides a network of small pores formed by nanotube entanglement. These nanoporous materials have diameters in the range of <2 nm that can be referred to as intercalated pores. Solvated ions in the electrolyte are unable to enter these small pores, but de-solvated ions that have reduced their ion dimensions are able to enter, resulting in larger ionic packing density and increased charge storage. The tailored sizes of pores in nano-structured carbon electrodes can maximize ion confinement, increasing specific capacitance by faradaic H_{2} adsorption treatment. Occupation of these pores by de-solvated ions from the electrolyte solution occurs according to (faradaic) intercalation.

=== Verification ===
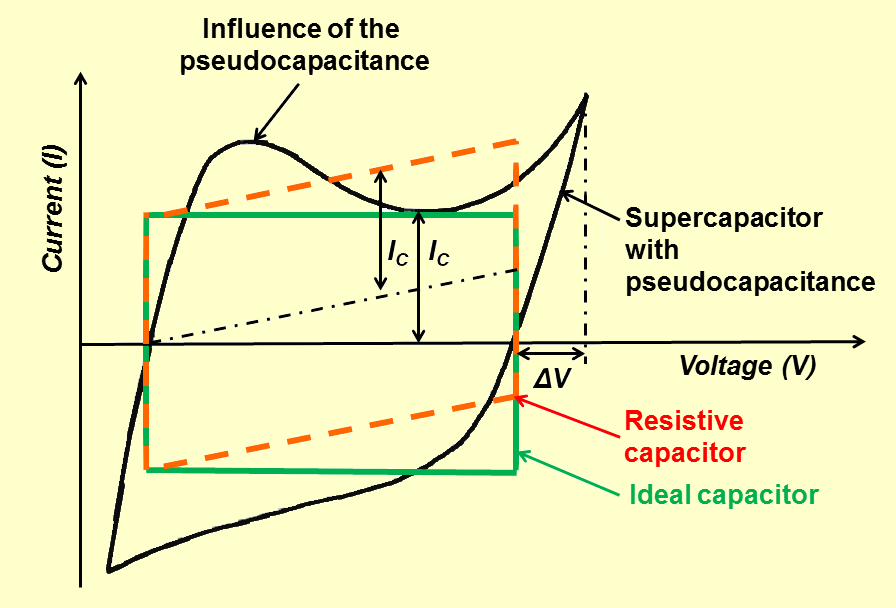
A cyclic voltammogram shows the fundamental difference of the current curves between static capacitors and pseudocapacitors

Pseudocapacitance properties can be expressed in a cyclic voltammogram. For an ideal double-layer capacitor, the current flow is reversed immediately upon reversing the potential yielding a rectangular-shaped voltammogram, with a current independent of the electrode potential. For double-layer capacitors with resistive losses, the shape changes to a parallelogram. In faradaic electrodes the electrical charge stored in the capacitor is strongly dependent on the potential, therefore, the voltammetry characteristics deviate from the parallelogram due to a delay while reversing the potential, ultimately coming from kinetic charging processes.

== Examples ==
Brezesinki et al. showed that mesoporous films of α-MoO_{3} have improved charge storage due to lithium ions inserting into the gaps of α-MoO_{3}. They claim this intercalation pseudocapacitance takes place on the same timescale as redox pseudocapacitance and gives better charge-storage capacity without changing kinetics in mesoporous MoO_{3}. This approach is promising for batteries with rapid charging ability, comparable to that of lithium batteries, and is promising for efficient energy materials.

Other groups have used vanadium oxide thin films on carbon nanotubes for pseudocapacitors. Kim et al. electrochemically deposited amorphous V_{2}O_{5}·xH_{2}O onto a carbon nanotube film. The three-dimensional structure of the carbon nanotubes substrate facilitates high specific lithium-ion capacitance and shows three times higher capacitance than vanadium oxide deposited on a typical Pt substrate. These studies demonstrate the capability of deposited oxides to effectively store charge in pseudocapacitors.

Conducting polymers, such as polypyrrole (PPy) and poly(3,4-ethylenedioxythiophene) (PEDOT), have tunable electronic conductivity and can achieve high doping levels with the proper counterion. A high-performing conducting polymer pseudocapacitor has high cycling stability after undergoing charge/discharge cycles. Successful approaches include embedding the redox polymer in a host phase (e.g. titanium carbide) for stability and depositing a carbonaceous shell onto the conducting polymer electrode. These techniques improve cyclability and stability of the pseudocapacitor device.

== Applications ==
Pseudocapacitance is used in processes that require High Power Faradaic Storage; for example: electrochemical capacitors, high-power batteries, capacitive deionization, and neuromorphic computing among others.

=== Examples ===
==== Energy storage ====
Materials that use pseudocapacitance are considered a great opportunity for achieving high rate, high energy density and high efficiency energy storage systems based on ion absorption and intercalation. Using its working properties of electrosorption and surface redox process at high-area electrode materials; for example RuO_{2} improves the energy storage properties of one of a traditional capacitor.

==== Biosensing ====
In the recent study, “Pseudocapacitance phenomena and applications in biosensing devices” by Raphael M.B. Oliveira, Flavio C.B. Fernandes, Paulo R. Bueno published in 2019, it was concluded that compounds with electrochemical capacitance or pseudocapacitance can be successfully used into the designed of interfaces for the biological detection of biomarkers.

==== Water deionization ====
Due to their charge transfer reactions, pseudocapacitive materials can also be used in water deionization; the high ion storage capacities and fast storage time necessary for water purification is kept during the process using this type of materials.

== Literature ==
- Héctor D. Abruña; Yasuyuki Kiya; Jay C. Henderson (2008), "Batteries and electrochemical capacitors" (PDF), Physics Today, vol. 61, no. 12, pp. 43–47, Bibcode:2008PhT....61l..43A, doi:10.1063/1.3047681
- Béguin, Francois; Raymundo-Piñero, E.; Frackowiak, Elzbieta (18 November 2009). "8 Electrical Double-Layer Capacitors and Pseudocapacitors". Carbons for Electrochemical Energy Storage and Conversion Systems. CRC Press. pp. 329–375. doi:10.1201/9781420055405. ISBN 978-1-4200-5540-5.
- Müller, Klaus; Bockris, J. O'M.; Devanathan, M. A. V. (1965). "On the Structure of Charged Interfaces". Proceedings of the Royal Society of London. Series A, Mathematical and Physical Sciences. 274 (1356): 55–79. Bibcode:1963RSPSA.274...55B. doi:10.1098/rspa.1963.0114. S2CID 94958336.
- B. E. Conway (1999), Electrochemical Supercapacitors: Scientific Fundamentals and Technological Applications (in German), Berlin: Springer, ISBN 978-0306457364
- Leitner, K. W.; Winter, M.; Besenhard, J. O. (December 2003). "Composite supercapacitor electrodes". Journal of Solid State Electrochemistry. 8 (1): 15–16. doi:10.1007/s10008-003-0412-x. ISSN 1432-8488. S2CID 95416761.
- Yu M., Volfkovich; Serdyuk, T. M. (September 2002). "Electrochemical Capacitors". Russian Journal of Electrochemistry. 38 (9): 935–959. doi:10.1023/A:1020220425954. ISSN 1608-3342.
- Aiping Yu; Aaron Davies; Zhongwei Chen (2011). "8 - Electrochemical Supercapacitors". In Jiujun Zhang; Lei Zhang; Hansan Liu; Andy Sun; Ru-Shi Liu (eds.). Electrochemical Technologies for Energy Storage and Conversion, Band 1. Weinheim: Wiley-VCH. pp. 317–376. ISBN 978-3-527-32869-7.
