= Michel Barsoum =

American material scientist and engineer

Michel W. Barsoum
- Born: January 1, 1955 (age 71); Cairo, Egypt
- Education: American University in Cairo (BSc, 1977); University of Missouri–Rolla (MSc, 1980); Massachusetts Institute of Technology (PhD, 1985)
- Known for: Work on MAX phases and MXenes
- Awards: International Ceramics Prize (2020); Royal Swedish Academy of Engineering Sciences Foreign Member (2016); American Ceramic Society Fellow (2005); Alexander von Humboldt-Max Planck Research Award (2000)
- Scientific career
- Fields: Materials science
- Workplaces: Drexel University
- Website: drexel.edu/engineering/about/faculty-staff/B/barsoum-michel/

Michel Barsoum, Egyptian-American Materials Scientist and Engineer

Michel W. Barsoum (born January 1, 1955, in Cairo, Egypt) is an Egyptian-American materials scientist and Distinguished Professor at Drexel University in the Department of Materials Science and Engineering. He is known for his work with MAX phases, and for research that led to the development of MXenes, a family of two-dimensional materials derived from MAX phases.

== Education ==
Barsoum was born on January 1, 1955, in Cairo, Egypt. He earned his Bachelor of Science in Materials Engineering from the American University in Cairo in 1977. He received a Master of Science in Ceramics Engineering from the University of Missouri–Rolla in 1980. Barsoum completed his PhD in Ceramics at the Massachusetts Institute of Technology in 1985.

== Academic career ==
Barsoum joined Drexel University in 1985 as an assistant professor in the Department of Materials Engineering (now Materials Science and Engineering). He was promoted to associate professor in 1991, full professor in 1997, and distinguished professor in 1999. He served as A.W. Grosvenor Professor from 2009 to 2013.

Barsoum has held visiting positions at the Max Planck Institute for Solid State Research (1993–1994 and 2000–2001), Los Alamos National Laboratory (Wheatley Scholar, 2008–2009), University of Poitiers (2003 and 2012), CEA Saclay (2006), Ningbo Institute of Materials Technology and Engineering (2013–2014), Imperial College London (Leverhulme Trust Visiting Professor, 2015), Institut Polytechnique de Grenoble (2016), and Linköping University (ongoing since 2008).

== Research ==
In the mid-1990s, Barsoum and El-Raghy worked on the MAX phases, ternary compounds with the formula M_{n+1}AX_{n} (where M is a transition metal, A is an A-group element, and X is carbon or nitrogen) that exhibit metallic conductivity and ceramic hardness. His group synthesized and characterized many MAX phases, including Ti_{3}SiC_{2}, establishing them as thermodynamically stable nanolaminates. These materials are used in high-temperature refractories, protective coatings, and nuclear reactor components due to their machinability, thermal shock resistance, and irradiation tolerance.

In 2011, Barsoum with M. Naguib and Y. Gogtsi, co-discovered MXenes, two-dimensional derivatives of MAX phases obtained by removing the A-layer.

Barsoum and Tucker identified ripplocations, a universal deformation mechanism in layered solids like graphite and MAX phases. They found that atomic layers, like all other layered systems, will buckle.

In 2022, Barsoum and El-Badr discovered a simple, scalable method to synthesize quantum-confined one-dimensional titania-based nanofilaments whose cross-sections are ≈ 5 × 7 Å^{2}. In 2024, he cofounded the company One-D Nano with G. Schwenk to market this discovery.

== Publications ==
Barsoum has authored two books in materials science:

- Fundamentals of Ceramics (McGraw-Hill, 1997; Taylor & Francis, 2002; CRC Press, 2019), a textbook on the structure, properties, and applications of ceramic materials.
- MAX Phases: Properties of Machinable Ternary Carbides and Nitrides (Wiley-VCH, 2013), covering the synthesis, properties, and applications of MAX phases.

== Awards and honors ==
- 2023: Fellow - National Academy of Inventors
- 2021: Horizon Prize - Royal Society of Chemistry
- 2020: International Ceramics Prize (Basic Science) - World Academy of Ceramics
- 2016: Foreign Member - Royal Swedish Academy of Engineering Sciences
- 2016: Chair of Excellence - Nanosciences Foundation
- 2013: Ross Coffin Purdy Award - American Ceramic Society
- 2005: Fellow - the American Ceramic Society
- 2000: Max Planck Research Award - Alexander von Humboldt Foundation
