= Yury Gogotsi =

Ukrainian scientist

- Юрій Гогоці
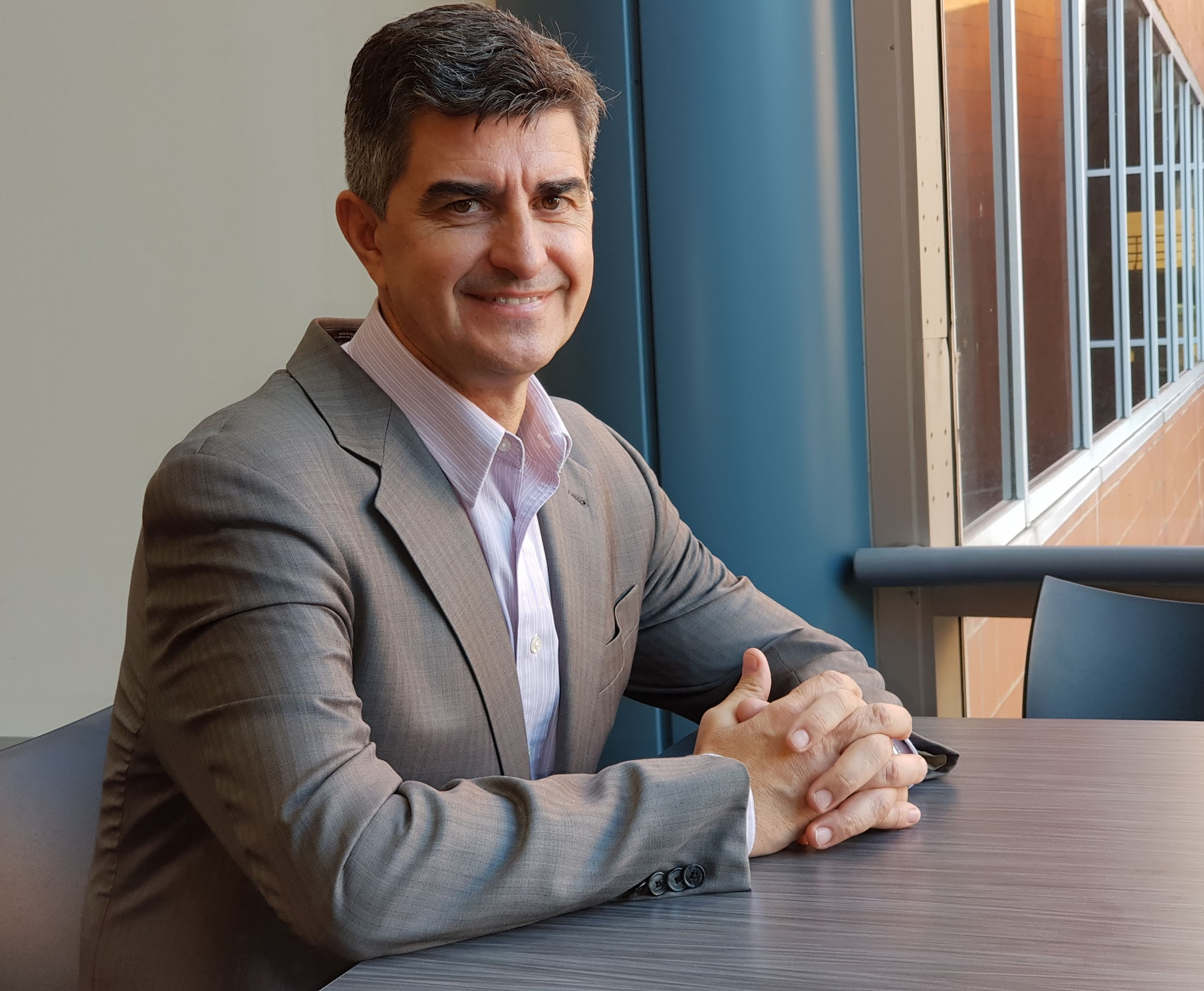
- Yury Gogotsi, Professor at Drexel University, USA
- Born: December 16, 1961 (age 64); Kiev, Ukrainian SSR, Soviet Union (now Kyiv, Ukraine)
- Occupation: Professor
- Employer: Drexel University College of Engineering

Yury Georgievich Gogotsi (Note: Ukrainian: Юрій Георгійович Гогоці, romanized: Yurii Heorhiiovych Hohotsi) (born December 16, 1961) is a scientist in the field of material chemistry, professor at Drexel University, Philadelphia, United States since 2000 in the fields of Materials Science and Engineering and Nanotechnology. Distinguished University and Trustee Chair professor of materials science at Drexel University — director of the A.J. Drexel Nanotechnology Institute (since 2014 – A.J. Drexel Nanomaterials Institute).

== Research contributions ==
Presently, Professor Y. Gogotsi leads a scientific research group that develops new nanostructured carbon materials (nanotubes, graphene, nanodiamonds, carbide-derived carbon, onion-like carbon) and works on the hydrothermal synthesis of carbon nanostructures and ceramics. He also contributed to development of effective water desalination and capacitive deionization techniques, electrical energy storage — batteries and supercapacitors, as well as applications of carbon nanomaterials for energy and biomedicine.

Gogotsi's work (together with P. Simon) on the relations between the structure and capacitive performance of carbon nanomaterials led to a scientific progress in the field and ultimately resulted in the development of a new generation of supercapacitors that facilitate the storage and utilization of electrical energy. Prof. Yury Gogotsi produced several publications (Science, 2006; Science 2010; Science 2011, etc.), with the Simon/Gogotsi review in Nature Materials published in 2008 currently being the most cited article (Web of Science) in the electrochemical capacitors (supercapacitors) field.

Gogotsi was a part of the team that discovered a new family of two-dimensional (2D) carbides and nitrides — MXenes that show exceptional potential for energy storage and other applications. He developed a general approach to synthesis of porous and low-dimensional materials using selective extraction of elements/components, which can be used to generate carbide-derived porous carbons, carbon nanotubes, graphene, 2D carbides, etc. He described new forms of carbon, such as conical and polygonal crystals. He also discovered a new metastable phase of silicon. His work on phase transformations under contact load contributed to the field of high-pressure surface science. He was the first to conduct hydrothermal synthesis of carbon nanotubes and show the anomalous slow movement of water in functionalized carbon nanotubes by in situ electron microscopy. This study ultimately led to development of nanotube-tipped single-cell probes.

Gogotsi is the co-author of two books, editor of 14 books, has more than 100 publications in conference proceedings, and more than 800 articles in peer reviewed journals, credited on more than 80 European and US patents (more than 30 licensed to industry) and more than 250 plenary, keynote and invited lectures and seminars. He has been cited over 300,000 times and currently has an h-index of 262 (Google Scholar) / 230 (Web of Science).

In the Stanford’s list of top 2% researchers in the world across all scientific disciplines, Yury Gogotsi was ranked #53 in 2019 among all living and deceased scientists.

== Education ==
In 1984 Yury Gogotsi received his Masters of Science (M.S.) degree in metallurgy from the Kyiv Polytechnic Institute, Department of high-temperature materials and powder metallurgy.

In 1986 he received his Ph.D. Candidate of Science in Physical Chemistry (advisor – prof. V.A.Lavrenko), at that time — the youngest Ph.D. in Chemistry in Ukraine, from the Kyiv Polytechnic Institute.

1995 he received a Doctor of Science (D.Sc.) degree in Materials Engineering from the National Academy of Sciences of Ukraine.

== Research and teaching ==
Drexel University College of Engineering, Philadelphia, United States
05/2017–present — Charles T. and Ruth M. Bach Endowed Professor;
2010—present — Distinguished University Professor;
2008—present — Trustee Chair Professor of Materials Science and Engineering;
2003—present — Founder and Director of the A.J. Drexel Nanotechnology Institute (since 2014 – A.J. Drexel Nanomaterials Institute);
2002—2007 — Associate Dean of the College of Engineering for Special Projects;
2002—present — Professor of Chemistry (courtesy appointment);
2001—present — Professor of Mechanical Engineering and Mechanics (courtesy appointment);
2000—present — Professor of Materials Science and Engineering;
University of Illinois at Chicago, Chicago, United States
2001—2003 — Adjunct Professor of Mechanical Engineering;
1999—2000 — Associate Professor of Mechanical Engineering with tenure;
1999—2000 — Assistant Director, UIC Research Resources Center;
1996—1999 — Assistant Professor of Mechanical Engineering
University of Tübingen, Germany
1995—1996 — Research Scientist
University of Oslo, Norway
1993—1995 — Research scientist at the Center for Materials Research, NATO/Norwegian Research Council Fellowship
Tokyo Institute of Technology, Japan
1992—1993 — Research scientist, Japan Society for the Promotion of Science (JSPS) Fellowship
University of Karlsruhe, Germany
1990—1992 — Research scientist, Alexander von Humboldt Fellowship
Institute for Materials Science, National Academy of Sciences, Ukraine
1986—1990 — Research scientist

== Honors and awards ==
Gogotsi has received many awards and recognitions for his research accomplishments, some of which include:
2021 — MRS-Serbia Award for a Lasting and Outstanding Contribution to Materials Science and Engineering
2021 — Manuel Cardona Lecture, Institut Català de Nanociència i Nanotecnologia
2021 — Honorary Doctorate, Sumy State University, Ukraine
2021 — ACS Award in the Chemistry of Materials
2021 — RASA-America Honorary Life Membership
2020 — ACS Philadelphia Section Award
2020 — George Gamow Award from the Russian-American Science Association (RASA)
2020 — International Ceramics Prize, the highest honor conferred by the World Academy of Ceramics;
2019 — Fellow, European Academy of Sciences;
2019 — Sosman Lecture, American Ceramic Society;
2018 — Clarivate Citations Laureate in physics (Web of Science/Clarivate) – work is deemed to be of Nobel stature;
2018 — The Friendship Award from Chinese government (the highest award for foreigners in P.R. China);
2018 — Rudolf Zahradnik Lecture, Regional Center of Advanced Technologies and Materials, University of Olomouc, Czech Republic;
2018 — Honorary Doctorate, National Technical University of Ukraine "Igor Sikorsky Kyiv Polytechnic Institute";
2018 — Fellow, International Society of Electrochemistry;
2018 — Tis Lahiri Memorial Lecture, Vanderbilt University;
2017 — Energy Storage Materials Award (Elsevier);
2017 — Honorary Doctorate from Frantsevich Institute for Problems of Materials Science, National Academy of Science of Ukraine;
2016 — Honorary professorship in Jilin University;
2016 — Honorary professorship in Beijing University of Chemical Technology;
2016 — Nano Energy Award
2015 — Has been admitted as a Fellow of the Royal Society of Chemistry (FRSC)
2015 — Laureate of RUSNANOPRIZE International Award
2014 — Honorary Doctor of Science (Doctor Honoris Causa) Paul Sabatier University (fr. de l'Université Toulouse III Paul Sabatier);
2014 — 2020 – Highly Cited Researcher (Thomson-Reuters) in Materials Science and Chemistry;
2014 — Fred Kavli Distinguished Lectureship, Materials Research Society Conference;
2013 — Ross Coffin Purdy Award, American Ceramic Society;
2012 — European Carbon Association Award;
2012 — Fellow, Materials Research Society;
2011 — NANOSMAT Prize at the 6th NANOSMAT Conference;
2009 — Fellow, American Association for Advancement of Science (AAAS);
2008 — Fellow, The Electrochemical Society;
2006 — NANO 50 Awards from NASA Tech Briefs Magazine in the Innovator and Technology categories;
2005 — Fellow of the American Ceramic Society and Fellow of the World Innovation Foundation;
2004 — Academician, World Academy of Ceramics;
2003 — R&D 100 Award from R&D magazine (received again in 2009);
2003 — Roland B. Snow Award from the American Ceramic Society (received again in 2005, 2007, 2009, 2012);
2002 — S. Somiya Award from the International Union of Materials Research Societies (IUMRS);
2002 — G.C. Kuczynski Prize from the International Institute for the Science of Sintering;
2002 — Research Achievement Award from Drexel University (received again in 2009);
2001 — repeatedly included in the publication of Who’s Who in the World, Who’s Who in America, Who’s Who Among America’s Teachers, Who’s Who in Science and Engineering, Who’s Who in Engineering Education, International Who’s Who of Professionals;
1993 — I.N. Frantsevich Prize from the Ukrainian Academy of Sciences
