= Patrice Simon =

French chemist (born 1969)

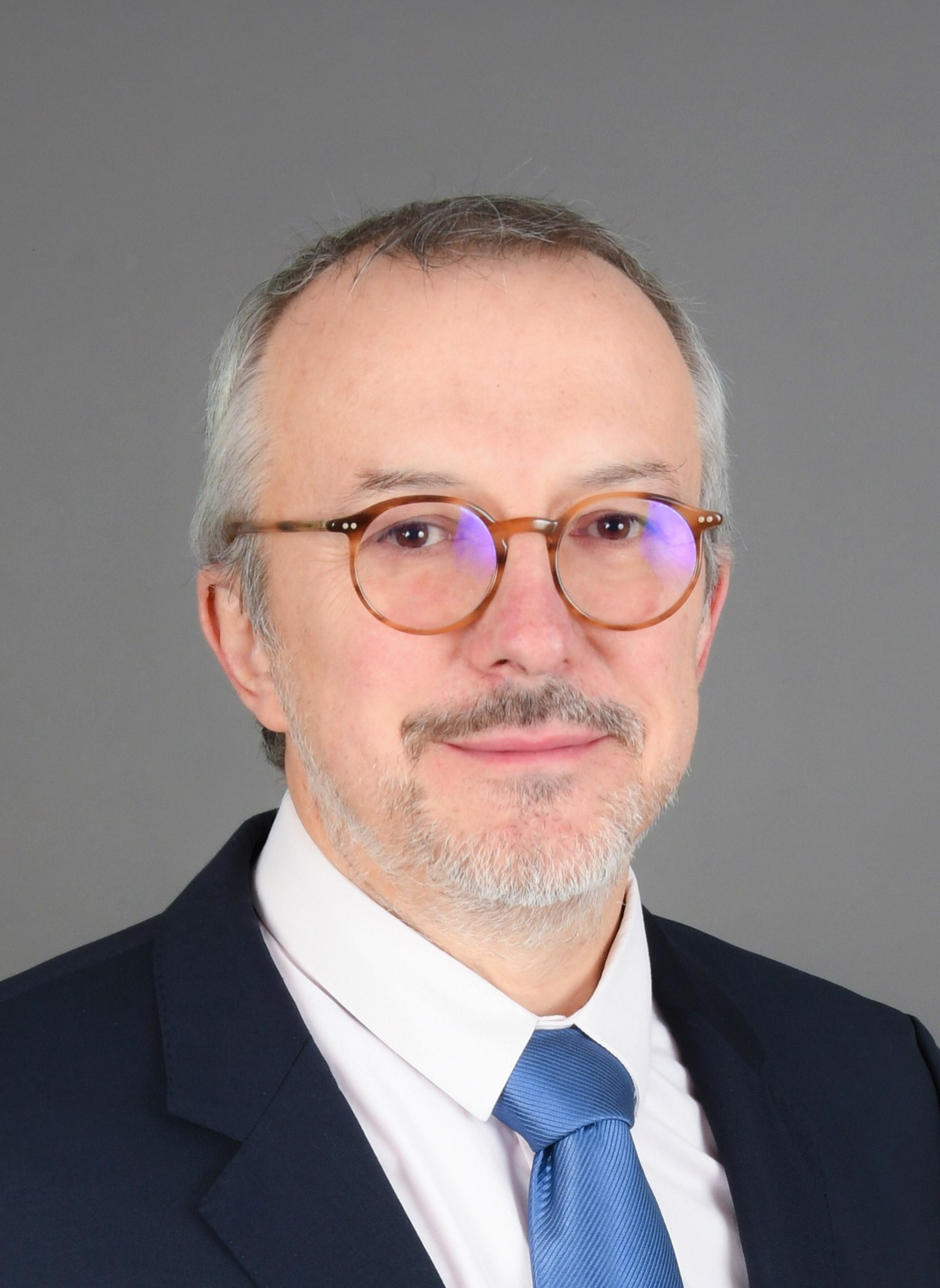
- Citizenship: France
- Education: ENSIACET (Ph.D. 1996, D.Sc. 2002)
- Awards: Tajima Prize (2009); Charles Eichner Medal (2015); CNRS silver medal (2015); RUSNANOPRIZE (2015); Clarivate Citation Laureates (2018)
- Scientific career
- Fields: Physical chemistry Materials science Electrochemistry
- Workplaces: Université de Toulouse

Patrice Simon (born 1969) is a French chemist in the field of materials science and electrochemistry. He is currently a Distinguished Professor at the Université de Toulouse (former Université Toulouse III Paul Sabatier) since 2007.

His research focuses on the synthesis and characterization of materials for electrochemical energy storage applications, particularly for power systems (supercapacitors and batteries). More specifically, he develops advanced electrochemical characterization techniques to understand the charge storage mechanisms in confined environments, a research topic he initiated in 2006 with Yury Gogotsi.

He currently serves as Director of the research network on electrochemical energy storage RS2E. Alongside Hélène Burlet (CEA), he also leads the "Priority Research Programs and Equipment" (PEPR) Batteries, funded as part of the national battery acceleration strategy.

Patrice Simon is Fellow of the French Academy of Sciences, of the French Academy of Technologies. He was also appointed as Fellow of the European Academy of Sciences and Academia Europaea.

== Biography ==
Simon studied at École Nationale Supérieure des Ingénieurs en Arts Chimiques et Technologiques (ENSIACET) in Toulouse, graduating with M.S. in metallurgy (1992) and Ph.D. in Materials science (1996). Thereafter he worked as assistant professor of Electrochemistry at the Conservatoire National des Arts et Métiers in Paris, and from 2001 at the CIRIMAT laboratory of materials science, Université Paul Sabatier, Toulouse. He received his D.Sc. from Université Paul Sabatier in 2002 and was appointed full Professor of Materials Sciences at CIRIMAT in 2007. He was promoted as Distinguished Professor in 2014. From 2010 to 2017 he served as Director of the European Research Institute ALISTORE ERI. He was awarded two ERC Grants, in 2012 and 2020.

== Research contributions ==
Supercapacitors are energy storage devices that have similar form factors to batteries, but offer higher power and a longer cycle life. A type of supercapacitors, called Electrochemical Double Layer Capacitors (EDLCs), use high surface area porous carbon as active materials. In these devices, charge storage is achieved electrostatically under polarization at the electrolyte / carbon interface, by reversible adsorption of ions from an electrolyte onto the carbon surface. Together with Prof Yury Gogotsi (Drexel university, USA), he demonstrated that ions from an electrolyte could partially desolvate to access small size nanopores (thought to be un-accessible) in porous carbon electrodes (Science 2006). His research may results in advances in commercial products. Modelling approaches were developed in collaboration with theoreticians to describe ion dynamics and organization in confined pores. He experimentally evidenced the concept of ion desolvation using advanced electrochemical techniques, such as Electrochemical Quartz Crystal Microbalance (EQCM).

The concept of ion desolvation during adsorption and charge storage capacity increase has also been shown in reduced graphene oxide electrode (rGO), pointing out the key role of the spontaneous interactions between the carbon surface and the electrolyte, that can be described by the zeta potential or its counterpart the potential of zero charge (PZC) in the process.

The confinement effect and its associated capacity increase was also observed in 2-Dimmensional (2D) materials such as MXene, that store the charge by fast redox reactions, making the concept of charge under confinement of key importance for designing fast charge materials for high power batteries.

== Awards and honours ==
=== 2024 ===
Highly Cited Researcher 2024

=== 2023 ===
Highly Cited Researcher 2023

=== 2022 ===
Highly Cited Researcher 2022

=== 2021 ===
Highly Cited Researcher 2021

=== 2020 ===
Member of the European Academy of Sciences

Highly Cited Researcher 2020

ERC Synergy Grant "MoMa-STOR" together with Prof. Markus Antonietti

=== 2019 ===
Member of the French Academy of Sciences

Honorary professorship in Beijing University of Chemical Technology

Highly Cited Researcher 2019

Member of Academia Europaea

Grand Prix Pierre-Süe of the Société Chimique de France

=== 2018 ===
Member of the French Academy of Technologies

Clarivate Citation Laureates

Highly Cited Researcher 2018

Brian Conway Award of the International Society of Electrochemistry

=== 2017 ===
Senior Member of the Institut Universitaire de France

=== 2016 ===
Fellow of the International Society of Electrochemistry

Highly Cited Researcher 2016

Lee Hsun Lecture Award on Materials Science, Chinese Academy of Science

=== 2015 ===
Silver Medal of the CNRS

RUSNANOPRIZE on Nanotechnologies

Charles Eichner Medal from French Materials and Metallurgy Society (SF2M)

=== 2012 ===
ERC Advanced Grant "IONACES"

Excellence Chair of the Airbus group Fondation

=== 2009 ===
Tajima Prize of the International Society of Electrochemistry

=== 2007 ===
Junior Member of the Institut Universitaire de France
