= Guoxiu Wang =

Australian materials scientist

- Known for: Battery technologies, energy storage
- Scientific career
- Fields: Materials chemistry
- Workplaces: University of Technology Sydney

Guoxiu Wang is an Australian-Chinese materials scientist and chemist known for his contributions in battery technologies, materials chemistry, electrochemistry, and energy storage. His research interests include lithium-ion batteries, lithium-air batteries, sodium-ion batteries, lithium-sulfur batteries, supercapacitors, hydrogen storage materials, graphene and MXenes.

== Education ==
Guoxiu Wang obtained his PhD in materials science from the University of Wollongong, Australia in 2001.

== Career ==
Guoxiu Wang is a distinguished professor at the University of Technology Sydney (2012–present) and director of the Centre for Clean Energy Technology (2010–Present). He was a Royal Society Wolfson Visiting Fellow at the University of Manchester, England.

Wang has delivered over 100 invited talks worldwide and has published over 700 refereed articles. He was listed by Clarivate Analytics as a highly cited researcher in the field of materials science for 9 consecutive years (2018-2026) as well as in the field of chemistry (2018, 2022-2024 and 2026).

Currently, he serves as an associate editor for Energy Storage Materials (Elsevier) and Electrochemical Energy Reviews (Springer Nature).

== Honours and awards ==
In 2017, Wang was made a Fellow of the Royal Society of Chemistry (FRSC). He became a Fellow of the International Society of Electrochemistry (ISE) in 2018, and in 2020 became a Fellow of the European Academy of Sciences

He received the 2022-2026 Research.com Materials Science in Australia Leader Award. In 2024, he was awarded the Australian Research Council Industry Laureate Fellowship. He was elected a Fellow of the Australian Academy of Science in May 2025 and Fellow of the Australian Academy of Technological Sciences & Engineering (ATSE) in September 2025.
