= Voltea =

- Type: Private
- Industry: Water Treatment
- Founded: 2006
- Headquarters: Dallas, TX
- Area served: Global
- Website: http://voltea.com/

Voltea is a water technology company based in Dallas, Texas.

== Overview ==
The company developed Capacitive DeIonization (CapDI), a desalination method that removes dissolved salts from brackish water. In 2016, the company opened an automated robotic production facility in Texas.

== Capacitive deionization (CapDI) ==
Capacitive deionization (CapDI) is an electrical process that combines oppositely charged electrodes with anionic and cationic selective membranes. When salt water flows into the cell between an electric field, the ions move through the selective membranes to the oppositely charged electrodes and desalinated water leaves the cell.

When the surface of both electrodes is covered with ions, the electrodes are cleaned by reversing the electrode polarity. The ions are pushed from the electrodes and are trapped between the membranes. The concentrated brine that forms between both membranes can then be removed from the cell. When the polarity of the electrodes is reset to normal, the cell is ready for use again.

In 2017, the company launched a point-of-use (PoU) device named DiUse. The device is self cleaning and delivers no-salt water softening and low cost brackish water desalination. The device is internet enabled and can be remotely monitored and controlled.

In 2018, Voltea launched a point-of-entry (PoE) device named DiEntry for whole-home water treatment.

== Partners ==
The company collaborated with Liquid Purification Engineers International (LPE) to enter the desalination markets of Thailand and Asia.

== Funding ==
The company backed €6 million from Anterra Capital, Rabobank, ETF and Unilever. The company raised another €10 million in 2017.

== Achievements ==
For the year 2018, the company was nominated for ‘2018 Global Water Awards’.
