= Kelsey Hatzell =

American materials scientist

- Education: Swarthmore College; Pennsylvania State University; Drexel University
- Scientific career
- Workplaces: Vanderbilt University; Princeton University; Lawrence Berkeley National Laboratory
- Thesis: Conducting (suspension) flowable electrodes for water and energy technologies (2015)
- Doctoral advisor: Yury Gogotsi

Kelsey Hatzell is an American materials scientist who is a professor at Princeton University. Hatzell studies new materials for sustainable technologies, with a focus on next-generation energy storage. She is interested in the nanoscale phenomena responsible for battery failure.

== Early life and education ==
Hatzell studied economics at Swarthmore College and mechanical engineering at Pennsylvania State University. She moved to Drexel University for her doctoral research, where she studied flowable electrodes for water and energy technologies with Yury Gogotsi. Her research involved electrochemistry, materials and colloidal science to create new electrode structures. She developed carbon-based and manganese oxide materials for scalable solid-state energy storage systems. After graduating, she moved to the Lawrence Berkeley National Laboratory, where she developed soft and hard x-ray techniques to understand the properties of polymers.

== Research and career ==
Hatzell was appointed an assistant professor at Vanderbilt University. Hatzell joined Princeton University in 2021. Her research considers new materials for sustainable technologies, with a focus on solid-state and redox flow batteries. She is particularly interested in why batteries fail. She identified that irregularities in electrolytes impacted the movement of ions, which could cause battery failure if the ions all migrated to particular locations. Hatzell has created inorganic membranes for high energy density batteries and grid storage.

Hatzell has developed strategies to minimize the costs of direct air capture systems, which generally require energy-intensive operating protocols to reduce the impact of carbon emissions and remove them from the atmosphere. These systems conventionally rely on heat or pressure changes to release captured carbon dioxide into storage (e.g. solvents heated to high temperatures). Hatzell developed an ion-exchange resin, which efficiently capture carbon dioxide at low humidity and release it at high humidity – without the need for high temperatures.

== Awards and honors ==
- 2015 Drexel Office of Graduate Studies Outstanding Doctoral Dissertation Award
- 2020 Sloan Research Fellowship
- 2020 Scialog Fellow
- 2021 National Science Foundation CAREER Award
- 2021 POLiS Award of Excellence
- 2022 NASA Early Career Achievement Medal
- 2023 Alfred Rheinstein Faculty Award
- 2023 Office of Naval Research Award
- 2024 Camille Dreyfus Teacher-Scholar Award
- 2025 Presidential Early Career Award for Scientists and Engineers

== Selected publications ==
- Chang E Ren; Kelsey B Hatzell; Mohamed Alhabeb; Zheng Ling; Khaled A Mahmoud; Yury Gogotsi (September 25, 2015). "Charge- and Size-Selective Ion Sieving Through Ti3C2Tx MXene Membranes". The Journal of Physical Chemistry Letters. 6 (20): 4026–4031. doi:10.1021/acs.jpclett.5b01895. ISSN 1948-7185. PMID 26722772. Wikidata Q47335960.
- Kelsey B. Hatzell; Marta C. Hatzell; Kevin M. Cook; Muhammad Boota; Gabrielle M. Housel; Alexander McBride; E. Caglan Kumbur; Yury Gogotsi (February 11, 2015). "Effect of oxidation of carbon material on suspension electrodes for flow electrode capacitive deionization". Environmental Science & Technology. 49 (5): 3040–3047. doi:10.1021/es5055989. ISSN 0013-936X. PMID 25633260. Wikidata Q43328828.
- Kelsey B. Hatzell; Muhammad Boota; Yury Gogotsi (September 28, 2015). "Materials for suspension (semi-solid) electrodes for energy and water technologies". Chemical Society Reviews. 44 (23): 8664–8687. doi:10.1039/c5cs00279f. ISSN 0306-0012. PMID 26412441. Wikidata Q38594199.
