= Electrochemical Energy Reviews =

- Discipline: Electrochemistry
- Language: English
- Edited by: Jiujun Zhang, Xueliang Andy Sun

Publication details
- History: 2018–present
- Publisher: Springer Nature
- Frequency: Quarterly
- Open access: Hybrid
- Impact factor: 28.905 (2020)

Standard abbreviations
- ISO 4: Electrochem. Energy Rev.

Indexing
- CODEN: EERLAM
- ISSN: 2520-8136 (print); 2520-8489 (web)
- LCCN: 2020207401

Links
- Journal homepage

Electrochemical Energy Reviews is a peer-reviewed scientific journal by Springer Nature. It is published on a quarterly basis. It was established in 2018 and is currently edited by Jiujun Zhang and Xueliang Andy Sun.

== Abstracting and indexing ==
The journal is abstracted and indexed in:

- Compendex
- DOAJ
- Science Citation Index Expanded
- Scopus

According to the Journal Citation Reports, the journal has a 2020 impact factor of 28.905.
