= Eli Fromm =

American engineer and academic

Eli Fromm (May 7, 1939 – January 20, 2025) was a German-born American professor emeritus and Electrical and Computer Engineering Leroy A. Brothers Professor in the College of Engineering at Drexel University.

Fromm received a B.S. degree in Electrical Engineering from Drexel in 1962, a Masters in Engineering also from Drexel in 1964, and his Ph.D. from Jefferson Medical College in 1967. He worked as in engineer in the Missile and Space Division of General Electric in 1962, then at the Applied Physics Laboratory at DuPont Company in Wilmington, Delaware, 1963; he began working at Drexel as an assistant professor in 1967. In 2002 he became the first recipient of the National Academy of Engineering's Gordon Prize, considered to be one of the Nobel Prizes of Engineering — the others being the Academies Russ Prize and Draper Prize.

Fromm was elected as a member into the National Academy of Engineering in 2004 for innovation and leadership in the development of a holistic curriculum for engineering education.

Fromm was born on May 7, 1939 in Niedaltdorf, Germany. He died on January 20, 2025 in Audubon, Pennsylvania.
