= MAX phases =

Compounds of carbides and nitrides

The MAX phases are layered, hexagonal carbides and nitrides that have the general formula: M_{n+1}AX_{n} (MAX), where n = 1 to 4, and M is an early transition metal, A is an A-group element (mostly IIIA and IVA), and X is carbon or nitrogen. The layered structure consists of edge-sharing, distorted XM_{6} octahedra interleaved by single planar layers of the A-group element.

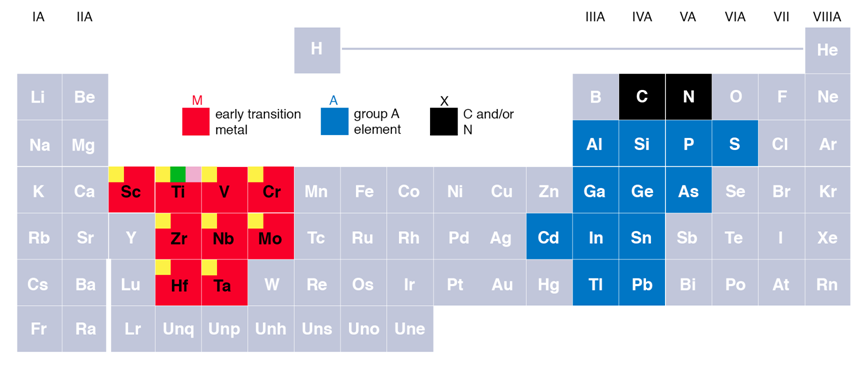
Elements in the periodic table that react together to form the remarkable MAX phases. The red squares represent the M-elements; the blue are the A elements; the black is X, or C and/or N. Last updated in 2011.

== History ==
In the 1960s, Hans Nowotny and co-workers discovered a large family of ternary, layered carbides and nitrides, which they called the 'H' phases, now known as the '211' MAX phases (i.e. n = 1), and several '312' MAX phases. Subsequent work extended to '312' phases such as Ti_{3}SiC_{2} and showed it to have unusual mechanical properties. In 1996, Barsoum and El-Raghy synthesized for the first time fully dense and phase pure Ti_{3}SiC_{2} and revealed, by characterization, that it possesses a distinct combination of some of the best properties of metals and engineering ceramics. In 1999 they also synthesized Ti_{4}AlN_{3} (i.e. a '413' MAX phase) and realized that they were dealing with a much larger family of solids that all behaved similarly. In 2020, Mo_{4}VAlC_{4} (i.e. a '514' MAX phase) was published, the first major expansion of the definition of the family in over twenty years. Since 1996, when the first "modern" paper was published on the subject, tremendous progress has been made in understanding the properties of these phases. Since 2006 research has focused on the fabrication, characterization and implementation of composites including MAX phase materials. Such systems, including aluminium–MAX phase composites, have the ability to further improve ductility and toughness over pure MAX phase material.

== Synthesis ==
The synthesis of ternary MAX phase compounds and composites has been realized by different methods, including combustion synthesis, chemical vapor deposition, physical vapor deposition at different temperatures and flux rates, arc melting, hot isostatic pressing, self-propagating high-temperature synthesis (SHS), reactive sintering, spark plasma sintering, mechanical alloying and reaction in molten salt. An element replacement method in molten salts is developed to obtain series of M_{n+1}ZnX_{n} and M_{n+1}CuX_{n} MAX phases.

== Properties ==
These carbides and nitrides possess an unusual combination of chemical, physical, electrical, and mechanical properties, exhibiting both metallic and ceramic characteristics under various conditions. These include high electrical and thermal conductivity, thermal shock resistance, damage tolerance, machinability, high elastic stiffness, and low thermal expansion coefficients. Some MAX phases are also highly resistant to chemical attack (e.g. Ti_{3}SiC_{2}) and high-temperature oxidation in air (Ti_{2}AlC, Cr_{2}AlC, and Ti_{3}AlC_{2}). They are useful in technologies involving high efficiency engines, damage tolerant thermal systems, increasing fatigue resistance, and retention of rigidity at high temperatures. These properties can be related to the electronic structure and chemical bonding in the MAX phases. It can be described as periodic alteration of high and low electron density regions. This allows for design of other nanolaminates based on the electronic structure similarities, such as Mo_{2}BC and PdFe_{3}N.

=== Electrical ===
The MAX phases are electrically and thermally conductive due to the metallic-like nature of their bonding. Most of the MAX phases are better electric and thermal conductors than Ti. This is also related to the electronic structure.

=== Physical ===
While MAX phases are stiff, they can be machined as easily as some metals. They can all be machined manually using a hacksaw, despite the fact that some of them are three times as stiff as titanium metal, with the same density as titanium. They can also be polished to a metallic luster because of their excellent electrical conductivity. They are not susceptible to thermal shock and are exceptionally damage tolerant. Some, such as Ti_{2}AlC and Cr_{2}AlC, are oxidation and corrosion resistant. Polycrystalline Ti_{3}SiC_{2} has zero thermopower, a feature which is correlated to their anisotropic electronic structure.

=== Mechanical ===
The MAX phases as a class are generally stiff, lightweight, and plastic at high temperatures. Due to the layered atomic structure of these compounds, some, like Ti_{3}SiC_{2} and Ti_{2}AlC, are also creep and fatigue resistant, and maintain their strengths to high temperatures. They exhibit unique deformation characterized by basal slip (evidences of out-of-basal plane a-dislocations and dislocation cross-slips were recently reported in MAX phase deformed at high temperature and Frank partial c-dislocations induced by Cu-matrix diffusion were also reported), a combination of kink and shear band deformation, and delaminations of individual grains. During mechanical testing, it has been found that polycrystalline Ti_{3}SiC_{2} cylinders can be repeatedly compressed at room temperature, up to stresses of 1 GPa, and fully recover upon the removal of the load while dissipating 25% of the energy. It was by characterizing these unique mechanical properties of the MAX phases that kinking non-linear solids were discovered. The micromechanism supposed to be responsible for these properties is the incipient kink band (IKB). However no direct evidence of these IKBs has been yet obtained, thus leaving the door open to other mechanisms that are less assumption-hungry. Indeed, a recent study demonstrates that the reversible hysteretic loops when cycling MAX polycrystals can be as well explained by the complex response of the very anisotropic lamellar microstructure.

== Potential applications ==
- Tough, machinable, thermal shock-resistant refractories
- High-temperature heating elements
- Coatings for electrical contacts
- Neutron irradiation resistant parts for nuclear applications
- Precursor for the synthesis of carbide-derived carbon
- Precursor for the synthesis of MXenes, a family of two-dimensional transition metal carbides, nitrides, and carbonitrides

== Table of MAX phases ==
MAX phases known to date, in both bulk and thin film (stoichiometric arrangements)
211	Ti_{2}CdC, Sc_{2}InC, Sc_{2}SnC,Ti_{2}AlC, Ti_{2}GaC, Ti_{2}InC, Ti_{2}TlC, V_{2}AlC, V_{2}GaC, Cr_{2}GaC, Ti_{2}AlN, Ti_{2}GaN, Ti_{2}InN, V_{2}GaN, Cr_{2}GaN, Ti_{2}GeC, Ti_{2}SnC, Ti_{2}PbC, V_{2}GeC, Cr_{2}AlC, Cr_{2}GeC, V_{2}PC, V_{2}AsC, Ti_{2}SC, Zr_{2}InC, Zr_{2}TlC, Nb_{2}AlC, Nb_{2}GaC, Nb_{2}InC, Mo_{2}GaC, Zr_{2}InN, Zr_{2}TlN, Zr_{2}SnC, Zr_{2}PbC, Nb_{2}SnC, Nb_{2}PC, Nb_{2}AsC, Zr_{2}SC, Nb_{2}SC, Hf_{2}InC, Hf_{2}TlC, Ta_{2}AlC, Ta_{2}GaC, Hf_{2}SnC, Hf_{2}PbC, Hf_{2}SnN, Hf_{2}SC, Zr_{2}AlC, Ti_{2}ZnC, Ti_{2}ZnN, V_{2}ZnC, Nb_{2}CuC, Mn_{2}GaC, Mo_{2}AuC, Ti_{2}AuN
312	Ti_{3}AlC_{2}, Ti_{3}GaC_{2}, Ti_{3}InC_{2}, V_{3}AlC_{2}, Ti_{3}SiC_{2}, Ti_{3}GeC_{2}, Ti_{3}SnC_{2}, Ta_{3}AlC_{2}, Ti_{3}ZnC_{2}, Zr_{3}AlC_{2}
413	Ti_{4}AlN_{3}, V_{4}AlC_{3}, Ti_{4}GaC_{3}, Ti_{4}SiC_{3}, Ti_{4}GeC_{3}, Nb_{4}AlC_{3}, Ta_{4}AlC_{3}, (Mo,V)_{4}AlC_{3}
514	Mo_{4}VAlC_{4}

== Related materials ==
=== MXenes ===
MXenes are two-dimensional variants of the MAX phases with general formula M_{n+1}X_{n}T_{x}. They are typically derived via selective wet chemical etching of A atoms from the MAX phase. This process also results in functionalization of the newly formed surfaces by T groups (e.g. solvent-derived: F, Cl, O, OH), which may later be modified by further chemical treatment.

=== ZIP phases ===
Recently, structurally related ternary intermetallic compounds referred to as ZIP phases have been reported. These materials exhibit dualistic atomic ordering and may crystallize in both cubic and hexagonal structural variants. The hexagonal modification shows certain crystallographic similarities to MAX phases, particularly in terms of layered atomic arrangements and complex sublattice ordering in ternary compositions.
