= Titanium silicon carbide =

Identifiers
CAS Number	12202-82-3
3D model (JSmol)	Interactive image
CompTox Dashboard (EPA)	DTXSID001336329
- InChI: InChI=1S/2C.Si.3Ti Key: RQBOCVZFBKCXSY-UHFFFAOYSA-N
- SMILES: [Ti].[Ti].[Ti].[Si].[C].[C]

Properties
Chemical formula	C_{2}SiTi_{3}
Molar mass	195.708 g·mol^{−1}
- Except where otherwise noted, data are given for materials in their standard state (at 25 °C [77 °F], 100 kPa). Infobox references

Titanium silicon carbide, chemical formula Ti_{3}SiC_{2}, is a material with both metallic and ceramic properties. It is one of the MAX phases.

== See also ==
- Silicide carbide

== Extra reading ==
- Medvedeva, N. I.; Novikov, D. L.; Ivanovsky, A. L.; Kuznetsov, M. V.; Freeman, A. J. (15 December 1998). "Electronic properties of -based solid solutions". Physical Review B. 58 (24): 16042–16050. doi:10.1103/PhysRevB.58.16042.
- Enyashin, A. N.; Ivanovskii, A. L. (27 June 2009). "Quantum-chemical modelling of nanotubes of titanium silicocarbides Ti2SiC, Ti3SiC2, and Ti4SiC3". Theoretical and Experimental Chemistry. 45 (2): 98–102. doi:10.1007/s11237-009-9077-6. S2CID 95916480.
