= Carbide-derived carbon =

Type of carbon materials

Carbide-derived carbon (CDC), also known as tunable nanoporous carbon, is the common term for carbon materials derived from carbide precursors, such as binary (e.g. SiC, TiC), or ternary carbides, also known as MAX phases (e.g., Ti_{2}AlC, Ti_{3}SiC_{2}). CDCs have also been derived from polymer-derived ceramics such as Si-O-C or Ti-C, and carbonitrides, such as Si-N-C. CDCs can occur in various structures, ranging from amorphous to crystalline carbon, from sp^{2}- to sp^{3}-bonded, and from highly porous to fully dense. Among others, the following carbon structures have been derived from carbide precursors: micro- and mesoporous carbon, amorphous carbon, carbon nanotubes, onion-like carbon, nanocrystalline diamond, graphene, and graphite. Among carbon materials, microporous CDCs exhibit some of the highest reported specific surface areas (up to more than 3000 m^{2}/g). By varying the type of the precursor and the CDC synthesis conditions, microporous and mesoporous structures with controllable average pore size and pore size distributions can be produced. Depending on the precursor and the synthesis conditions, the average pore size control can be applied at sub-Angstrom accuracy. This ability to precisely tune the size and shapes of pores makes CDCs attractive for selective sorption and storage of liquids and gases (e.g., hydrogen, methane, CO_{2}) and the high electric conductivity and electrochemical stability allows these structures to be effectively implemented in electrical energy storage and capacitive water desalinization.

== History ==
The production of SiCl_{4} by high temperature reaction of chlorine gas with silicon carbide was first patented in 1918 by Otis Hutchins, with the process further optimized for higher yields in 1956. The solid porous carbon product was initially regarded as a waste byproduct until its properties and potential applications were investigated in more detail in 1959 by Walter Mohun. Research was carried out in the 1960-1980s mostly by Russian scientists on the synthesis of CDC via halogen treatment, while hydrothermal treatment was explored as an alternative route to derive CDCs in the 1990s. Most recently, research activities have centered on optimized CDC synthesis and nanoengineered CDC precursors.

== Nomenclature ==
Historically, various terms have been used for CDC, such as "mineral carbon" or "nanoporous carbon". Later, a more adequate nomenclature introduced by Yury Gogotsi was adopted that clearly denotes the precursor. For example, CDC derived from silicon carbide has been referred to as SiC-CDC, Si-CDC, or SiCDC. Recently, it was recommended to adhere to a unified precursor-CDC-nomenclature to reflect the chemical composition of the precursor (e.g., B_{4}C-CDC, Ti_{3}SiC_{2}-CDC, W_{2}C-CDC).

== Synthesis ==
CDCs have been synthesized using several chemical and physical synthesis methods. Most commonly, dry chlorine treatment is used to selectively etch metal or metalloid atoms from the carbide precursor lattice. The term "chlorine treatment" is to be preferred over chlorination as the chlorinated product, metal chloride, is the discarded byproduct and the carbon itself remains largely unreacted. This method is implemented for commercial production of CDC by Skeleton in Estonia and Carbon-Ukraine. Hydrothermal etching has also been used for synthesis of SiC-CDC which yielded a route for porous carbon films and nanodiamond synthesis.

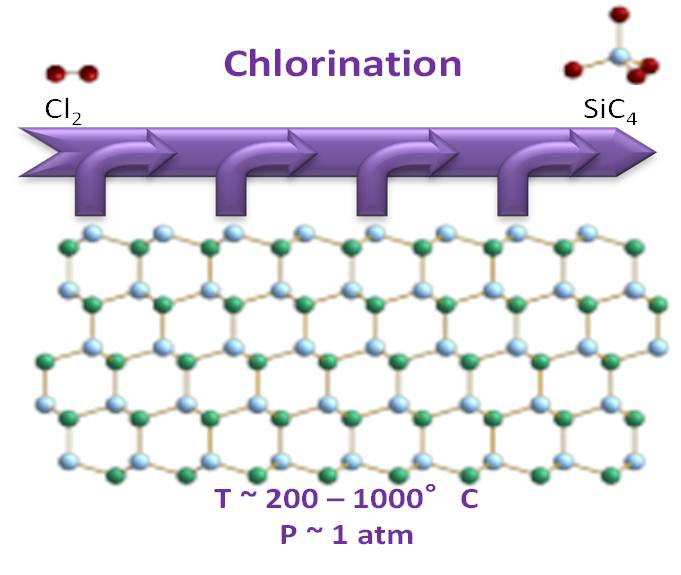
Schematic of chlorine etching of to produce a porous carbon structure.

=== Chlorine treatment ===
The most common method for producing porous carbide-derived carbons involves high-temperature etching with halogens, most commonly chlorine gas. The following generic equation describes the reaction of a metal carbide with chlorine gas (M: Si, Ti, V; similar equations can be written for other CDC precursors):

MC (solid) + 2 Cl_{2} (gas) → MCl_{4}(gas) + C (solid)

Halogen treatment at temperatures between 200 and 1000 °C has been shown to yield mostly disordered porous carbons with a porosity between 50 and ~80 vol% depending on the precursor. Temperatures above 1000 °C result in predominantly graphitic carbon and an observed shrinkage of the material due to graphitization.

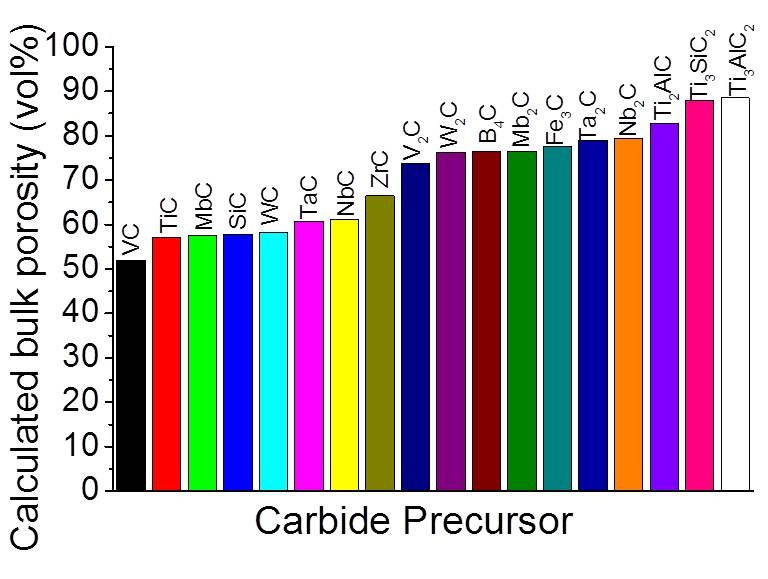
Different bulk porosity of CDCs derived from different carbide precursors.

The linear growth rate of the solid carbon product phase suggests a reaction-driven kinetic mechanism, but the kinetics become diffusion-limited for thicker films or larger particles. A high mass transport condition (high gas flow rates) facilitates the removal of the chloride and shifts the reaction equilibrium towards the CDC product. Chlorine treatment has successfully been employed for CDC synthesis from a variety of carbide precursors, including SiC, TiC, B_{4}C, BaC_{2}, CaC_{2}, Cr_{3}C_{2}, Fe_{3}C, Mo_{2}C, Al_{4}C_{3}, Nb_{2}C, SrC_{2}, Ta_{2}C, VC, WC, W_{2}C, ZrC, ternary carbides such as Ti_{2}AlC, Ti_{3}AlC_{2}, and Ti_{3}SiC_{2}, and carbonitrides such as Ti_{2}AlC_{0.5}N_{0.5}.

Most produced CDCs exhibit a prevalence of micropores (< 2 nm) and mesopores (between 2 and 50 nm), with specific distributions affected by carbide precursor and synthesis conditions. Hierarchic porosity can be achieved by using polymer-derived ceramics with or without utilizing a templating method. Templating yields an ordered array of mesopores in addition to the disordered network of micropores. It has been shown that the initial crystal structure of the carbide is the primary factor affecting the CDC porosity, especially for low-temperature chlorine treatment. In general, a larger spacing between carbon atoms in the lattice correlates with an increase in the average pore diameter. As the synthesis temperature increases, the average pore diameter increases, while the pore size distribution becomes broader. The overall shape and size of the carbide precursor, however, is largely maintained and CDC formation is usually referred to as a conformal process.

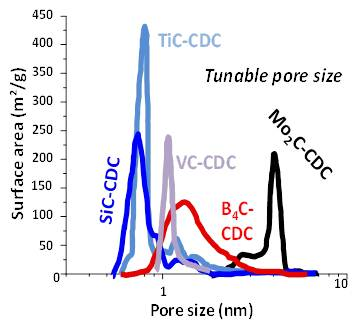
Pore size distributions for different carbide precursors.

=== Vacuum decomposition ===
Metal or metalloid atoms from carbides can selectively be extracted at high temperatures (usually above 1200 °C) under vacuum. The underlying mechanism is incongruent decomposition of carbides, using the high melting point of carbon compared to corresponding carbide metals that melt and eventually evaporate away, leaving the carbon behind.

Like halogen treatment, vacuum decomposition is a conformal process. The resulting carbon structures are, as a result of the higher temperatures, more ordered, and carbon nanotubes and graphene can be obtained. In particular, vertically aligned carbon nanotubes films of high tube density have been reported for vacuum decomposition of SiC. The high tube density translates into a high elastic modulus and high buckling resistance which is of particular interest for mechanical and tribological applications.

While carbon nanotube formation occurs when trace oxygen amounts are present, very high vacuum conditions (approaching 10^{−8}–10^{−10} torr) result in the formation of graphene sheets. If the conditions are maintained, graphene transitions into bulk graphite. In particular, by vacuum annealing silicon carbide single crystals (wafers) at 1200–1500 °C, metal/metalloid atoms are selectively removed and a layer of 1–3 layer graphene (depending on the treatment time) is formed, undergoing a conformal transformation of 3 layers of silicon carbide into one monolayer of graphene. Also, graphene formation occurs preferentially on the Si-face of the 6H-SiC crystals, while nanotube growth is favored on the c-face of SiC.

=== Hydrothermal decomposition ===
The removal of metal atoms from carbides has been reported at high temperatures (300–1000 °C) and pressures (2–200 MPa). The following reactions are possible between metal carbides and water:

x/2 MC + x H_{2}O → M_{x/2}O_{x} + x/2 CH_{4}

MC + (x+1) H_{2}O → MO_{x} + CO + (x+1) H_{2}

MC + (x+2) H_{2}O → MO_{x} + CO_{2} + (x+2) H_{2}

MC + x H_{2}O → MO_{x} + C + x H_{2}

Only the last reaction yields solid carbon. The yield of carbon-containing gases increases with pressure (decreasing solid carbon yield) and decreases with temperatures (increasing the carbon yield). The ability to produce a usable porous carbon material is dependent on the solubility of the formed metal oxide (such as SiO_{2}) in supercritical water. Hydrothermal carbon formation has been reported for SiC, TiC, WC, TaC, and NbC. Insolubility of metal oxides, for example TiO_{2}, is a significant complication for certain metal carbides (e.g., Ti_{3}SiC_{2}).

== Applications ==
One application of carbide-derived carbons is as active material in electrodes for electric double layer capacitors which have become commonly known as supercapacitors or ultracapacitors. This is motivated by their good electrical conductivity combined with high surface area, large micropore volume, and pore size control that enable to match the porosity metrics of the porous carbon electrode to a certain electrolyte. In particular, when the pore size approaches the size of the (desolvated) ion in the electrolyte, there is a significant increase in the capacitance. The electrically conductive carbon material minimizes resistance losses in supercapacitor devices and enhances charge screening and confinement, maximizing the packing density and subsequent charge storage capacity of microporous CDC electrodes.

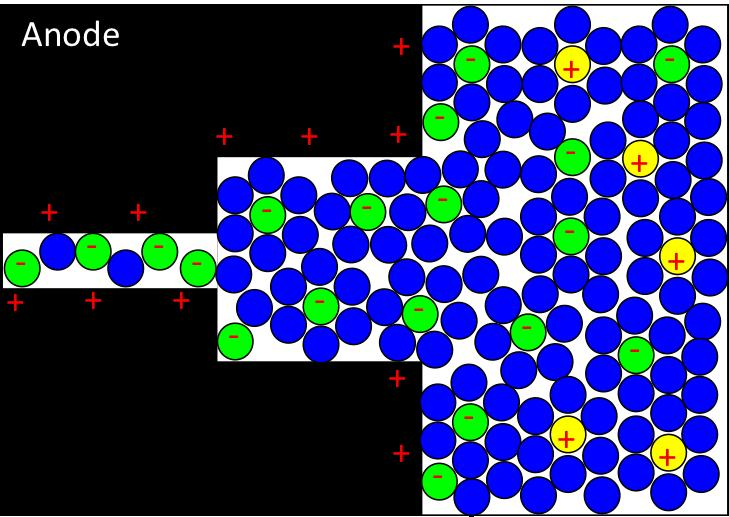
Confinement of solvated ions in pores, such as those present in CDCs. As the pore size approaches the size of the solvation shell, the solvent molecules are removed, resulting in larger ionic packing density and increased charge storage capability.

CDC electrodes have been shown to yield a gravimetric capacitance of up to 190 F/g in aqueous electrolytes and 180 F/g in organic electrolytes. The highest capacitance values are observed for matching ion/pore systems, which allow high-density packing of ions in pores in superionic states. However, small pores, especially when combined with an overall large particle diameter, impose an additional diffusion limitation on the ion mobility during charge/discharge cycling. The prevalence of mesopores in the CDC structure allows for more ions to move past each other during charging and discharging, allowing for faster scan rates and improved rate handling abilities. Conversely, by implementing nanoparticle carbide precursors, shorter pore channels allow for higher electrolyte mobility, resulting in faster charge/discharge rates and higher power densities.

== Proposed applications ==
=== Gas storage and carbon dioxide capturing ===
TiC-CDC activated with KOH or CO_{2} store up to 21 wt.% of methane at 25 °C at high pressure. CDCs with subnanometer pores in the 0.50–0.88 nm diameter range have shown to store up to 7.1 mol CO_{2}/kg at 1 bar and 0 °C. CDCs also store up to 3 wt.% hydrogen at 60 bar and −196 °C, with additional increases possible as a result of chemical or physical activation of the CDC materials. SiOC-CDC with large subnanometer pore volumes are able to store over 5.5 wt.% hydrogen at 60 bar and −196 °C, almost reaching the goal of the US Department of Energy of 6 wt.% storage density for automotive applications. Methane storage densities of over 21.5 wt.% can be achieved for this material at those conditions. In particular, a predominance of pores with subnanometer diameters and large pore volumes are instrumental towards increasing storage densities.

=== Tribological coatings ===
CDC films obtained by vacuum annealing (ESK) or chlorine treatment of SiC ceramics yield a low friction coefficient. The friction coefficient of SiC, which is widely used in tribological applications for its high mechanical strength and hardness, can therefore decrease from ~0.7 to ~0.2 or less under dry conditions. It's important to mention that graphite cannot operate in dry environments. The porous 3-dimensional network of CDC allows for high ductility and an increased mechanical strength, minimizing fracture of the film under an applied force. Those coatings find applications in dynamic seals. The friction properties can be further tailored with high-temperature hydrogen annealing and subsequent hydrogen termination of dangling bonds.

=== Protein adsorption ===
Carbide-derived carbons with a mesoporous structure remove large molecules from biofluids. As other carbons, CDCs possess good biocompatibility. CDCs have been demonstrated to remove cytokines such as TNF-alpha, IL-6, and IL-1beta from blood plasma. These are the most common receptor-binding agents released into the body during a bacterial infection that cause the primary inflammatory response during the attack and increase the potential lethality of sepsis, making their removal a very important concern. The rates and levels of removal of above cytokines (85–100% removed within 30 minutes) are higher than those observed for comparable activated carbons.

=== Catalyst support ===
Pt nanoparticles can be introduced to the SiC/C interface during chlorine treatment (in the form of Pt_{3}Cl_{3}). The particles diffuse through the material to form Pt particle surfaces, which may serve as catalyst support layers. In particular, in addition to Pt, other noble elements such as gold can be deposited into the pores, with the resulting nanoparticle size controlled by the pore size and overall pore size distribution of the CDC substrate. Such gold or platinum nanoparticles can be smaller than 1 nm even without employing surface coatings. Au nanoparticles in different CDCs (TiC-CDC, Mo_{2}C-CDC, B_{4}C-CDC) catalyze the oxidation of carbon monoxide.

=== Capacitive deionization (CDI) ===
As desalinization and purification of water is critical for obtaining deionized water for laboratory research, large-scale chemical synthesis in industry and consumer applications, the use of porous materials for this application has received particular interest. Capacitive deionization operates in a fashion with similarities to a supercapacitor. As an ion-containing water (electrolyte) is flown between two porous electrodes with an applied potential across the system, the corresponding ions assemble into a double layer in the pores of the two terminals, decreasing the ion content in the liquid exiting the purification device. Due to the ability of carbide-derived carbons to closely match the size of ions in the electrolyte, side-by-side comparisons of desalinization devices based on CDCs and activated carbon showed a significant efficiency increase in the 1.2–1.4 V range compared to activated carbon.

== Commercial production and applications ==
Having originated as the by-product of industrial metal chloride synthesis, CDC has certainly a potential for large-scale production at a moderate cost. Currently, only small companies engage in production of carbide-derived carbons and their implementation in commercial products. For example, Skeleton, which is located in Tartu, Estonia, and Carbon-Ukraine, located in Kyiv, Ukraine, have a diverse product line of porous carbons for supercapacitors, gas storage, and filtration applications. In addition, numerous education and research institutions worldwide are engaged in basic research of CDC structure, synthesis, or (indirectly) their application for various high-end applications.

== See also ==
- Hydrogen storage
- Hydrogen economy
- Nanotechnology
- Nanomaterials
- Nanoengineering
- Allotropes of carbon
