= Jiujun Zhang =

Chinese-Canadian electrochemist (born 1956)

Jiujun Zhang (Chinese: 张久俊; born August 1956) is a Chinese-born Canadian electrochemist and engineer. He is a professor and dean of the College of Materials Science and Engineering at Fuzhou University.

Zhang was elected a Fellow of the Royal Society of Canada's Academy of Science in 2017 and a Fellow of the International Society of Electrochemistry. He was elected a foreign member of the Chinese Academy of Engineering in 2023.

== Early life and education ==
Zhang was born in August 1956 in Suzhou, Anhui, China. He entered Peking University in 1978, where he received a bachelor's degree in physical chemistry in 1982 and a master's degree in electrochemistry in 1985. He received a doctorate in electrochemistry from Wuhan University in 1988.

== Career ==
Zhang worked at Huazhong Normal University. From 1991 to 1996, he conducted postdoctoral research at the California Institute of Technology, York University, and the University of British Columbia.

Zhang worked at Ballard Power Systems, where his work included research on proton-exchange membrane fuel cells and their catalysts. He later joined the National Research Council Canada, where he became a principal research officer.

From 2016 to 2021, Zhang worked at Shanghai University, where he served as dean of the College of Sciences and dean of the Institute for Sustainable Energy.

In October 2021, Zhang joined Fuzhou University on a full-time basis. In December of that year, he was appointed dean of its College of Materials Science and Engineering and dean of the Institute for New Energy Materials and Engineering.

== Research ==
Zhang's research concerns electrochemical energy storage and conversion and related materials. His research areas include electrocatalysis, fuel cells, lithium and other batteries, metal–air batteries, supercapacitors, carbon dioxide electroreduction, and water electrolysis.

His earlier work included the development and evaluation of electrocatalysts and catalyst layers for proton-exchange membrane fuel cells, including research into alternatives to platinum-based catalysts. His research has also included electrochemical sensors and other electrochemical devices.

== Awards ==
Zhang was elected a Fellow of the Engineering Institute of Canada in 2016. He was elected a Fellow of the Royal Society of Chemistry in 2016 and a Fellow of the Academy of Science of the Royal Society of Canada in 2017.

Zhang is a Fellow of the International Society of Electrochemistry.

In 2023, Zhang was elected a foreign member of the Chinese Academy of Engineering. The academy's biographical listing also records his 2023 election.

Zhang was a founder of the International Academy of Electrochemical Energy Science (IAOEES), established in 2013, and has served as its president.

== Selected books ==
- Zhang, Jiujun, ed. (2008). PEM Fuel Cell Electrocatalysts and Catalyst Layers: Fundamentals and Applications. Springer. doi:10.1007/978-1-84800-936-3. ISBN 978-1-84800-935-6.
- Liu, Hansan; Zhang, Jiujun (2008). Electrocatalysis of Direct Methanol Fuel Cells: From Fundamentals to Applications. Wiley-VCH.
- Wilkinson, David P.; Zhang, Jiujun; Hui, Rob; Fergus, Jeffrey; Li, Xianguo (2009). Proton Exchange Membrane Fuel Cells: Materials Properties and Performance. CRC Press.
- Yu, Aiping; Chabot, Victor; Zhang, Jiujun (2013). Electrochemical Supercapacitors for Energy Storage and Delivery: Fundamentals and Applications. CRC Press.
- Zheng, Yun; Yu, Bo; Wang, Jianchen; Zhang, Jiujun (2019). Carbon Dioxide Reduction through Advanced Conversion and Utilization Technologies. CRC Press.
