= Capacitive deionization =

Water deionization technique

Capacitive deionization (CDI) is a technology to deionize water by applying an electrical potential difference over two electrodes, which are often made of porous carbon. In other words, CDI is an electro-sorption method using a combination of a sorption media and an electrical field to separate ions and charged particles. Anions, ions with a negative charge, are removed from the water and are stored in the positively polarized electrode. Likewise, cations (positive charge) are stored in the cathode, which is the negatively polarized electrode.

Today, CDI is mainly used for the desalination of brackish water, which is water with a low or moderate salt concentration (below 10 g/L). Other technologies for the deionization of water are, amongst others, distillation, reverse osmosis and electrodialysis. Compared to reverse osmosis and distillation, CDI is considered to be an energy-efficient technology for brackish water desalination. This is mainly because CDI removes the salt ions from the water, while the other technologies extract the water from the salt solution.

Historically, CDI has been referred to as electrochemical demineralization, "electrosorb process for desalination of water", or electrosorption of salt ions. It also goes by the names of capacitive desalination, or in the commercial literature as "CapDI".

== History ==
In 1960 the concept of electrochemical demineralization of water was reported by Blair and Murphy. In that study, it was assumed that ions were removed by electrochemical reactions with specific chemical groups on the carbon particles in the electrodes. In 1968 the commercial relevance and long term operation of CDI was demonstrated by Reid. In 1971 Johnson and Newman introduced theory for ion transport in porous carbon electrodes for CDI and ion storage according to a capacitor mechanism. From 1990 onward, CDI attracted more attention because of the development of new electrode materials, such as carbon aerogels and carbon nanotube electrodes. In 1996, Farmer et al. also introduced the term capacitive deionization and used the now commonly abbreviation "CDI" for the first time. In 2004, Membrane Capacitive Deionization was introduced in a patent of Andelman.

== Process ==
=== Adsorption and desorption cycles ===
The operation of a conventional CDI system cycles through two phases: an adsorption phase where water is desalinated and a desorption phase where the electrodes are regenerated. During the adsorption phase, a potential difference over two electrodes is applied and ions are adsorbed from the water. In the case of CDI with porous carbon electrodes, the ions are transported through the interparticle pores of the porous carbon electrode to the intraparticle pores, where the ions are electrosorbed in the so-called electrical double layers (EDLs). After the electrodes are saturated with ions, the adsorbed ions are released for regeneration of the electrodes. The potential difference between electrodes is reversed or reduced to zero. In this way, ions leave the electrode pores and can be flushed out of the CDI cell resulting in an effluent stream with a high salt concentration, the so-called brine stream or concentrate. Part of the energy input required during the adsorption phase can be recovered during this desorption step.

Adsorption of ions from the brackish water to desalinate it

Desorption of ions from the brackish water to regenerate the electrodes

=== Ion adsorption in Electrical Double Layers ===
Any amount of charge should always be compensated by the same amount of counter-charge. For example, in an aqueous solution the concentration of the anions equals the concentration of cations. However, in the EDLs formed in the intraparticle pores in a carbon-based electrode, an excess of one type of ion over the other is possible, but it has to be compensated by electrical charge in the carbon matrix. In a first approximation, this EDL can be described using the Gouy-Chapman-Stern model, which distinguishes three different layers:

- The porous carbon matrix, which contains the electrical charge in the carbon structure.
- A Stern layer is located between the carbon matrix and the diffuse layer. The Stern-layer is a dielectric layer, i.e. it separates two layers with charge, but it does not carry any charge itself.
- The diffuse layer, in which the ions compensate the electrical charge of the carbon matrix. The ions are diffusively distributed in this layer. The width of the diffuse layer can often be approximated using the Debye length, characterizing the distance for concentration of counter-ions to decrease by the factor 1/e. To illustrate this, the Debye length is about 3.1 nm at 20 °C and for a 10 mM NaCl solution. This implies that more than 95% of the electrical charge in the carbon matrix is compensated in a diffuse layer with a width of about 9 nm.

As the carbon matrix is charged, the charge has to be compensated by ionic charge in the diffuse layer. This can be done by either the adsorption of counterions, or the desorption of co-ions (ions with an equal charge sign as the one in the carbon matrix).

Electrical Double Layer (model according to the Gouy-Chapman-Stern theory)

Besides the adsorption of ionic species due to the formation of EDLs in the intraparticle pores, ions can form a chemical bond with the surface area of the carbon particles as well. This is called specific adsorption, while the adsorption of ions in the EDLs is referred to as non-specific adsorption.

== Advantages of capacitive deionization ==
=== Scalable and simple to operate ===
CDI has low investment and infrastructure cost, as the process discussed above does not require high pressures or temperatures, unlike membrane or thermal processes.

=== Low energy cost for treatment of brackish water ===
In CDI, the energy cost per volume of treated water scales approximately with the amount of removed salt, while in other technologies such as reverse osmosis, desalination energy scales roughly with volume of treated water. This makes CDI a viable solution for desalination of low salt content streams, or more specifically, brackish water.

== Membrane capacitive deionization ==
By inserting two ion exchange membranes, a modified form of CDI is obtained, namely Membrane Capacitive Deionization. This modification improves the CDI cell in several ways:

- Co-ions do not leave the electrodes during the adsorption phase, as described above (see Ion adsorption in Electrical Double Layers for explanation). Instead, due to the inclusion of the ion exchange membranes, these co-ions will be kept in the interparticle pores of the electrodes, which enhances the salt adsorption efficiency.
- Since these co-ions cannot leave the electrodes and because the electroneutrality condition applies for the interparticle pores, extra counter-ions must pass through the ion-exchange membranes, which gives rise to a higher salt adsorption as well.
- Operating MCDI at constant current mode can produce freshwater with a stable effluent concentration (see constant voltage vs. constant current for more information).
- The required energy input of MCDI is lower than of CDI.

Capacitive deionization during the adsorption cycle

Membrane capacitive deionization during the adsorption cycle

== Constant voltage vs. constant current operation mode ==
A CDI cell can be operated in either the constant voltage or the constant current mode.

=== Constant voltage operation ===
During the adsorption phase of CDI using constant voltage operation, the salt effluent salt concentration decreases, but after a while, the effluent salt concentration increases again. This can be explained by the fact that the EDLs (in case of a carbon-based CDI system) are uncharged at the beginning of an adsorption step, which results in a high potential difference (electrical driving force on the ions) over the two electrodes. When more ions are adsorbed in the EDLs, the EDL potential increases and the remaining potential difference between the electrodes, which drives the ion transport, decreases. Because of the decreasing ion removal rate, the effluent concentration increases again.

=== Constant current operation ===
Since the ionic charge transported into the electrodes is equal to the applied electric current, applying a constant current allows a better control on the effluent salt concentration compared to the constant voltage operation mode. However, for a stable effluent salt concentration membranes should be incorporated in the cell design (MCDI), as the electric current does not only induce counter-ion adsorption, but co-ion depletion as well (see Membrane capacitive deionization vs. Capacitive deionization for an explanation).

== Cell geometries ==
=== Flow-by mode ===
The electrodes are placed in a stack with a thin spacer area in between, through which the water flows. This is by far the most commonly used mode of operation and electrodes, which are prepared in a similar fashion as for electrical double layer capacitors with a high carbon mass loading.

=== Flow-through mode ===
In this mode, the feed water flows straight through the electrodes, i.e. the water flows directly through the interparticle pores of the porous carbon electrodes. This approach has the benefit of ions directly migrating through these pores, hence mitigating transport limitations encountered in the flow-by mode.

=== Flow-electrode capacitive deionization ===
This geometrical design is comparable to the flow-by mode with the inclusion of membranes in front of both electrodes, but instead of having solid electrodes, a carbon suspension (slurry) flows between the membranes and the current collector. A potential difference is applied between both channels of flowing carbon slurries, the so-called flow electrodes, and water is desalinated. Since the carbon slurries flow, the electrodes do not saturate and therefore this cell design can be used for the desalination of water with high salt concentrations as well (e.g. sea water, with salt concentrations of approximately 30 g/L). A discharging step is not necessary; the carbon slurries are, after leaving the cell, mixed together and the carbon slurry can be separated from a concentrated salt water stream.

=== Capacitive deionization with wires ===
The freshwater stream can be made to flow continuously in a modified CDI configuration where the anode and cathode electrode pairs are not fixed in space, but made to move cyclically from one stream, in which the cell voltage is applied and salt is adsorbed, to another stream, where the cell voltage is reduced and salt is released.

Flow-through CDI cell during the adsorption cycle

Flow-electrode CDI cell during the adsorption cycle

== Electrode materials ==
For a high performance of the CDI cell, high quality electrode materials are of utmost importance. In most cases, carbon is the choice as porous electrode material. Regarding the structure of the carbon material, there are several considerations. As a high salt electrosorption capacity is important, the specific surface area and the pore size distribution of the carbon accessible for ions should be large. Furthermore, the used material should be stable and no chemical degradation of the electrode (degradation) should occur in the voltage window applied for CDI. The ions should be able to move fast through the pore network of the carbon and the conductivity of the carbon should be high. Lastly, the costs of the electrode materials are important to take into consideration.

Nowadays, activated carbon (AC) is the commonly used material, as it is the most cost efficient option and it has a high specific surface area. It can be made from natural or synthetic sources. Other carbon materials used in CDI research are, for example, ordered mesoporous carbon, carbon aerogels, carbide-derived carbons, carbon nanotubes, graphene and carbon black. Recent work argues that micropores, especially pores < 1.1 nm are the most effective for salt adsorption in CDI. In order to mitigate the drawbacks associated with mass transfer and electric double layer overlapping, and simultaneously harness the benefits of higher surface area and higher electric fields that come with microporous structure, innovative ongoing efforts have attempted to integrate the advantages of micropores and mesopores by fabricating hierarchical porous carbons (HPCs) that possess multi levels of porosities.

However, activated carbon, at only US$4/kg for commodity carbon and US$15/kg for highly purified, specially selected supercapacitor carbon, remains much cheaper than the alternatives, which cost US$50/kg or more. Larger activated carbon electrodes are much cheaper than relatively small exotic carbon electrodes, and can remove just as much salt for a given current. The performance increase from novel carbons is insufficient to motivate their use at this point, especially since virtually all CDI applications under serious near-term consideration are stationary applications, where unit size is a relatively minor consideration.

Nowadays, electrode materials based on redox-chemistry are more and more studied, such as sodium manganese oxide (NMO) and prussian blue analogues (PBA).

== Energy requirements ==
Since the ionic content of water is demixed during a CDI adsorption cycle, the entropy of the system decreases and an external energy input is required. The theoretical energy input of CDI can be calculated as follows:

$\Delta G=R*T*\Phi_{v,fresh}*(C_{feed}-C_{fresh})\left[\frac{ln \alpha}{1-\alpha}-\frac{ln \beta}{1-\alpha}\right]$

where R is the gas constant (8.314 J mol^{−1} K^{−1}), T the temperature (K), Φ_{v,fresh}, the flow rate of the fresh water outflow (m^{3}/s), C_{feed} the concentration of ions in the feed water (mol/m^{3}) and C_{fresh} the ion concentration in the fresh water outflow (mol/m^{3}) of the CDI cell. α is defined C_{feed}/C_{fresh} and β as C_{feed}/C_{conc}, with C_{conc} the concentration of the ions in the concentrated outflow.

In practice, the energy requirements will be significantly higher (20 times or higher) than the theoretical energy input. Important energy requirements, which are not included in the theoretical energy requirements, are pumping, and losses in the CDI cell due to internal resistances. If MCDI and CDI are compared for the energy required per removed ion, MCDI has a lower energy requirement than CDI.

Comparing CDI with reverse osmosis of water with salt concentrations lower than 20 mM, lab-scale research shows that the energy consumption in kWh per m^{3} freshwater produced can be lower for MCDI than for reverse osmosis.

== Large-scale CDI facilities ==
In 2007, a 10,000 tons per day full-scale CDI plant was built in China for improving the reclaimed water quality by ESTPURE. This project enables the reduction of total dissolved solids from 1,000 mg/L to 250 mg/L and turbidity from 10 NTU to 1 NTU, a unit indicating the cloudiness of a fluid. The water recovery can reach 75%. Electrical energy consumption level is 1 kWh/m^{3}, and the cost for water treatment is 0.22 US dollars/m^{3}. Some other large-scale projects can be seen from the table below.

Water source	Scale (m^{3}/d)	Water recovery rate	Salt removal rate	Energy consumption (kWh/m^{3} produced water)	Reference
Municipal wastewater being treated by first and second order processes + circulating water	10000	75%	75%	1.03	
Cooling water	120000	75%	85% of Cl^{−}	0.75	
Wastewater	2400	75%	≥50%	1.33	

== Other uses ==
Capacitive deionization can be used to remove the toxic herbicides diquat and paraquat from water solutions. A test using activated charcoal removed over 98%.
