= Drexel University College of Engineering =

University unit in Philadelphia, Pennsylvania, US

Coordinates: 39.95411°N 75.18673°W

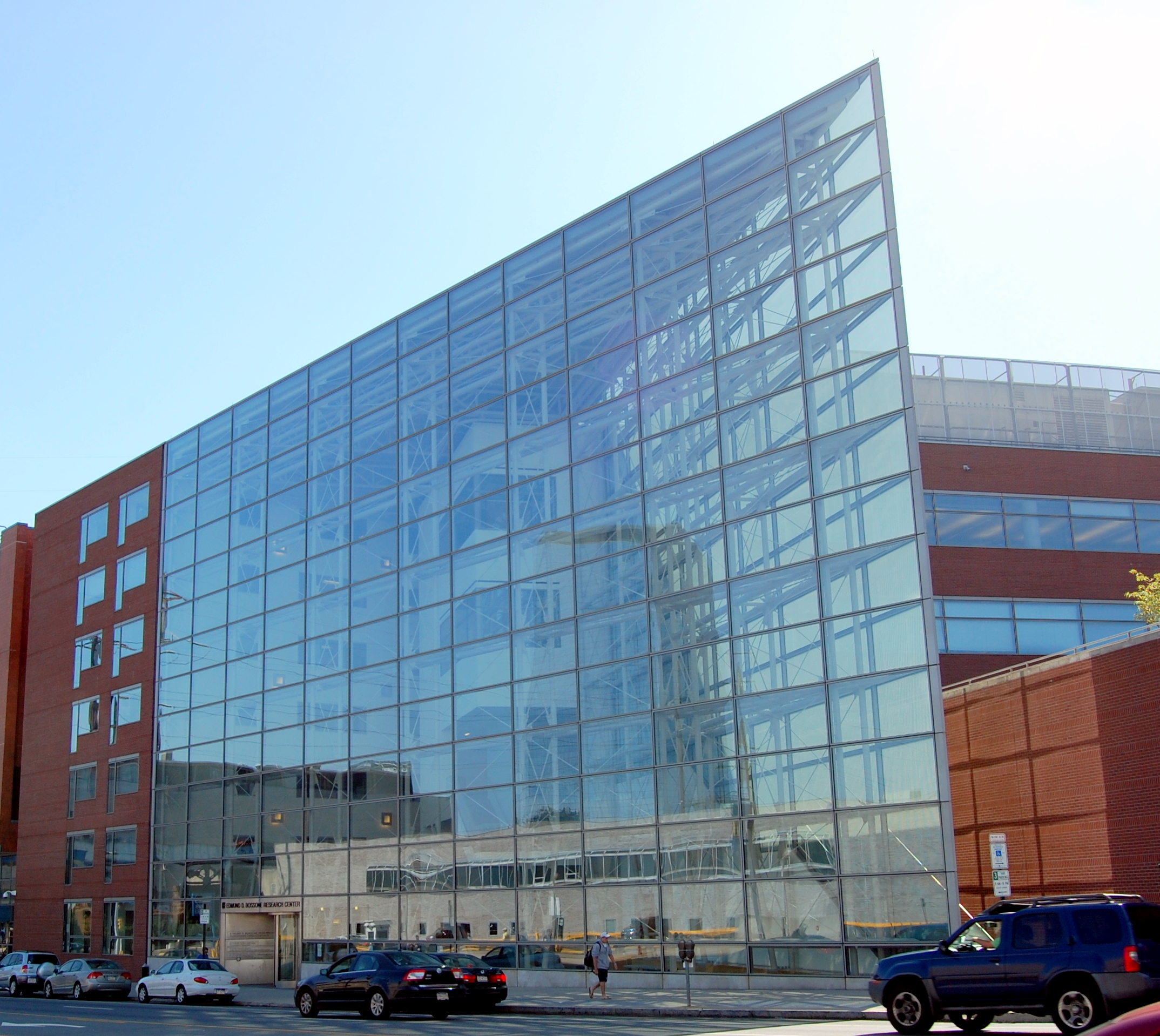
- Bossone Research Enterprise Center
- Type: Private
- Established: 1891
- Parent institution: Drexel University
- President: John Anderson Fry
- Dean: Sharon L. Walker
- Undergraduates: 3256
- Postgraduates: 379
- Doctoral students: 287
- Location: 3100 Market Street, Philadelphia, PA, 19104, USA
- Campus: Urban
- Website: drexel.edu/engineering

The Drexel University College of Engineering is the university's flagship college, founded in 1891 by banker A.J. Drexel to prepare his hometown Philadelphians to participate in opportunities provided by the Industrial Revolution. The college has six departments, 11 undergraduate programs/majors, and 17 graduate degree programs at its main campus in the University City section of Philadelphia, one block from 30th Street Station.

The college is listed in the U.S. News & World Report 2023-24 rankings as #54 for Best Undergraduate Engineering Programs and #97 in Best Engineering Schools (graduate). Drexel was cited by Forbes magazine as one of the top 25 STEM (science, technology, engineering, mathematics) schools in the country. The Material Science and Engineering depart was ranked #29 for Global Universities in 2023 by U.S. News & World Report.

== History ==
The Drexel Institute of Art, Science and Industry was founded in 1891 with a $3 million investment by banker Anthony J. Drexel, who played a major role in the rise of modern global finance after the American Civil War. Drexel foresaw the need for an institution with an emphasis on science and technology that would advance the common ideals of a just and diverse society by providing open access to higher education.

Drexel offered a Bachelor of Science in Engineering degree beginning in 1914. In 1943, the first women enrolled in the School of Engineering and in 1945 the school became the College of Engineering. The first graduate degrees were conferred in 1952.

== Academics ==
Drexel's College of Engineering offers undergraduate and graduate degrees in six academic departments:

- Department of Chemical and Biological Engineering
- Department of Civil, Architectural and Environmental Engineering
- Department of Electrical and Computer Engineering
- Department of Engineering Leadership and Society (includes Engineering Technology and Engineering Management)
- Department of Materials Science and Engineering
- Department of Mechanical Engineering and Mechanics

There are also several institutes and centers:

- A.J. Drexel Institute of Energy and the Environment
- A.J. Drexel Nanomaterials Institute
- C. & J. Nyheim Plasma Institute
- Center for Electric Power Engineering
- Centralized Research Facilities
- Expressive and Creative Interaction Technologies
- Materials Center of Excellence

The college has one of the nation's oldest cooperative education programs, established in 1919. Under the program, students alternate study with six-month cycles of full-time, professional employment both within and without the university, and at institutes and universities abroad. Up to 99% of undergraduates in the college participate in the co-op program.

== Research ==
The Carnegie Classification of Institutions of Higher Education classifies Drexel University as "R1: Doctoral Universities – Highest research activity," the highest category which includes just 37 private institutions. General research areas at the College of Engineering include advanced manufacturing, cyber and physical infrastructure, health and medicine, automation, computation, engineering education, materials, and systems engineering.

Translational and novel research is supported by grants and funding from extra-University sources such as the National Science Foundation, the Defense Advanced Research Projects Agency, the National Institutes of Health, the Office of Naval Research, and the Army Research Laboratory.

Research expenditures for the college in 2018 were $20,081,937. In 2017, Drexel University was ranked 54th (tie) in the Top 100 Worldwide Universities Granted US Utility Patents by the National Academy of Inventors.

== Notable alumni ==
Alumni from the college of engineering include astronauts Christopher Ferguson and Paul W. Richards, inventor of network packet switching Paul Baran, developers of barcode technology Bernard Silver and Norman Joseph Woodland, professor Eli Fromm, AI researcher and podcast host Lex Fridman, financier Bennett S. LeBow, and engineer David H. Geiger.
