= MXenes =

Class of two-dimensional inorganic compounds

In materials science, MXenes (pronounced "max-enes") are a class of two-dimensional inorganic compounds along with MBorenes, that consist of atomically thin layers of transition metal carbides, nitrides, or carbonitrides. MXenes accept a variety of hydrophilic terminations. The first MXene was reported in 2011 at Drexel University's College of Engineering, and was named by combining the prefix "MAX" or "MX" (for MAX phases), with "ene" by analogy to graphene.

== Structure ==
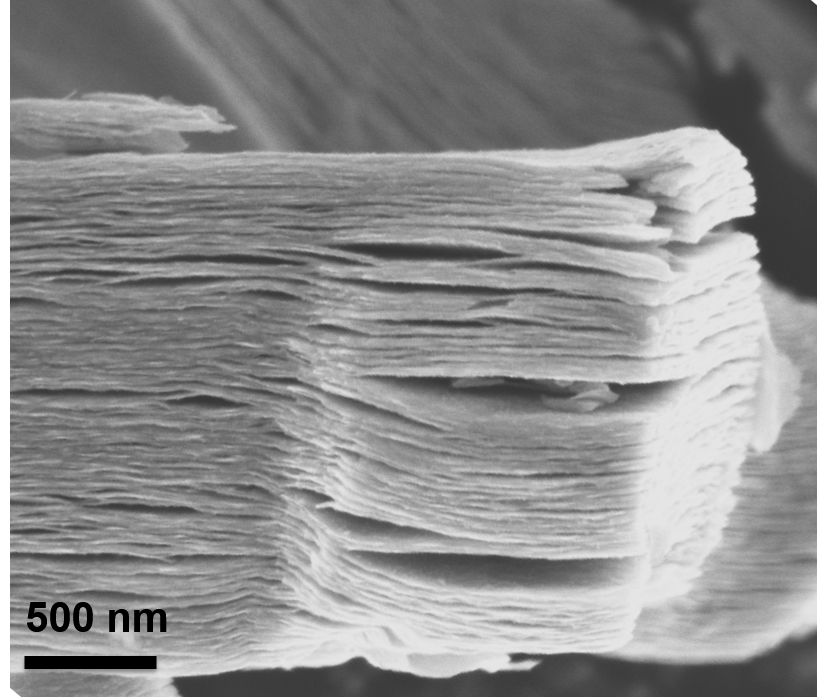
Scanning electron microscope image of the MXene produced by HF-etching of Ti_{3}AlC_{2}

As-synthesized MXenes prepared via HF etching have an accordion-like morphology, which can be referred to as multi-layer MXene (ML-MXene), or few-layer MXene (FL-MXene) for fewer than five layers. Because the surfaces of MXenes can be terminated by functional groups, the naming convention M_{n+1}X_{n}T_{x} can be used, where T is a functional group (e.g. O, F, OH, Cl).

=== Mono transition ===
MXenes adopt three structures with one metal on the M site, as inherited from the parent MAX phases: M_{2}C, M_{3}C_{2}, and M_{4}C_{3}. They are produced by selectively etching out the A element from a MAX phase or other layered precursor (e.g., Mo_{2}Ga_{2}C), which has the general formula M_{n+1}AX_{n}, where M is an early transition metal, A is an element from group 13 or 14 of the periodic table, X is C and/or N, and n = 1–4. MAX phases have a layered hexagonal structure with P6_{3}/mmc symmetry, where M layers are nearly close packed and X atoms fill octahedral sites. Therefore, M_{n+1}X_{n} layers are interleaved with the A element, which is metallically bonded to the M element.

=== Double transition ===
Double transition metal MXenes can take two forms, ordered double transition metal MXenes or solid solution MXenes. Ordered double transition metal MXenes have the general formulas: M'_{2}M"C_{2} or M'_{2}M"_{2}C_{3} where M' and M" are transition metals. Double transition metal carbides that have been synthesized include Mo_{2}TiC_{2}, Mo_{2}Ti_{2}C_{3}, Cr_{2}TiC_{2}, and Mo_{4}VC_{4}. In some of these MXenes (such as Mo_{2}TiC_{2}, Mo_{2}Ti_{2}C_{3}, and Cr_{2}TiC_{2}), the Mo or Cr atoms are on outer edges of the MXene and control electrochemical properties.

Solid-solution MXenes have the general formulas: (M'_{2−y}M"_{y})C, (M'_{3−y}M"_{y})C_{2}, (M'_{4−y}M"_{y})C_{3}, or (M'_{5−y}M"_{y})C_{4}, where the metals are randomly distributed throughout the structure in solid solutions leading to continuously tailorable properties.

=== Divacancy ===
By designing a parent 3D atomic laminate, (Mo_{2/3}Sc_{1/3})_{2}AlC, with in-plane chemical ordering, and by selectively etching the Al and Sc atoms, 2D Mo_{1.33}C sheets with ordered metal divacancies may be possible.

== Synthesis ==
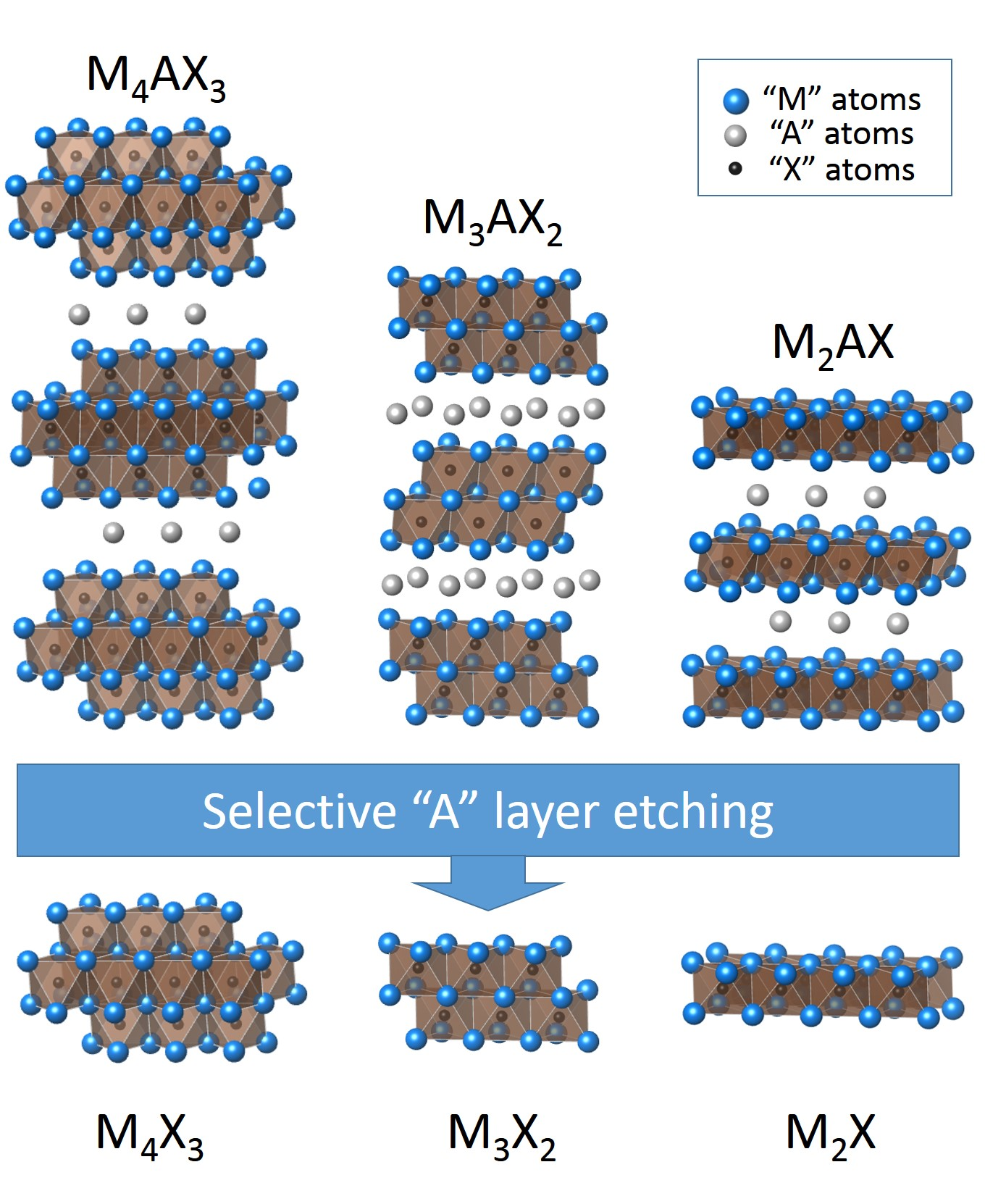
MXenes are produced by selective etching of the "A" element from the MAX phase structure

MXenes are typically synthesized by a top-down selective etching process. This synthetic route is scalable, with no loss or change in properties with batch size. Producing a MXene by etching a MAX phase occurs mainly by using etching solutions that contain a fluoride ion (F^{−}), such as hydrofluoric acid (HF), ammonium bifluoride (NH_{4}HF_{2}), and a mixture of hydrochloric acid (HCl) and lithium fluoride (LiF). For example, etching of Ti_{3}AlC_{2} in aqueous HF at room temperature causes the A (Al) atoms to be selectively removed, and the surface of the carbide layers becomes terminated by O, OH, and/or F atoms. MXene can also be obtained in Lewis acid molten salts, such as ZnCl_{2}, and a Cl terminal can be realized. The Cl-terminated MXene is structurally stable up to 750 °C. A general Lewis acid molten salt approach can etch most of MAX phases members (such as MAX-phase precursors with A elements Si, Zn, and Ga) by some other melts (CdCl_{2}, FeCl_{2}, CoCl_{2}, CuCl_{2}, AgCl, and NiCl_{2}).

The MXene Ti_{4}N_{3} was the first nitride MXene reported, and is prepared by a different procedure than for carbide MXenes. To synthesize Ti_{4}N_{3}, the MAX phase Ti_{4}AlN_{3} is mixed with a molten eutectic fluoride salt mixture of lithium fluoride, sodium fluoride, and potassium fluoride and treated at elevated temperatures. This procedure etches out Al, yielding multilayered Ti_{4}N_{3}, which can be delaminated into single and few layers by immersing the MXene in tetrabutylammonium hydroxide, followed by sonication.

MXenes can also be synthesized directly or via CVD processes. In 2024, single crystalline monolayer W5N6 was synthesized by CVD in wafer scale, which shows promise for electronic applications.

In a 2018 report, Peng et al. described a hydrothermal etching technique. In this etching method, the MAX phase is treated in the solution of acid and salt under high pressure and temperature conditions. The method is more effective in producing MXene dots and nano-sheets. Moreover, it is safer since HF fumes are not released during the etching process.

=== Types ===
==== Mono transition ====
2-1 MXenes: Ti_{2}C, V_{2}C, Nb_{2}C, Mo_{2}C Mo_{2}N, Ti_{2}N, (Ti_{2−y}Nb_{y})C, (V_{2−y}Nb_{y})C, (Ti_{2−y}V_{y})C, W_{1.33}C, Nb_{1.33}C, Mo_{1.33}C, Mo_{1.33}Y_{0.67}C

3-2 MXenes: Ti_{3}C_{2}, Ti_{3}CN, Zr_{3}C_{2} and Hf_{3}C_{2}

4-3 MXenes: Ti_{4}N_{3}, Nb_{4}C_{3}, Ta_{4}C_{3}, V_{4}C_{3}, (Mo,V)_{4}C_{3}

5-4 MXenes: Mo_{4}VC_{4}

==== Double transition ====
2-1-2 MXenes: Mo_{2}TiC_{2}, Cr_{2}TiC_{2}, Mo_{2}ScC_{2}

2-2-3 MXenes: Mo_{2}Ti_{2}C_{3}

== Covalent surface modification ==
2D transition-metal carbides surfaces can be chemically transformed with a variety of functional groups such as O, NH, S, Cl, Se, Br, and Te surface terminations as well as bare MXenes. The strategy involves installation and removal of the surface groups by performing substitution and elimination reactions in molten inorganic salts. Covalent bonding of organic molecules to MXene surfaces was demonstrated through reaction with aryl diazonium salts. Moreover, heating and re-termination experiments of Ti_{3}C_{2}T_{x} showed that H_{2}O, with a strong bonding to the Ti-Ti bridge-sites, can be considered as a termination species. An O and H_{2}O terminated Ti_{3}C_{2}T_{x}-surface restricts the CO_{2} adsorption to the Ti on-top sites and may reduce the ability to store positive ions, such as Li^{+} and Na^{+}. An O and H_{2}O terminated Ti_{3}C_{2}T_{x}-surface shows the capability to split water.

== Intercalation and delamination ==
Since MXenes are layered solids and interlayer bonding is weak, intercalation of guest molecules is possible. Guest molecules include dimethyl sulfoxide (DMSO), hydrazine, and urea. For example, N_{2}H_{4} (hydrazine) can be intercalated into Ti_{3}C_{2}(OH)_{2} with the molecules parallel to the MXene basal planes to form a monolayer. Intercalaction increases the MXene c lattice parameter (crystal structure parameter that is directly proportional to the distance between individual MXene layers), which weakens the bonding between MX layers. Ions, including Li^{+}, Pb^{2+}, and Al^{3+}, can also be intercalated into MXenes, either spontaneously or when a negative potential is applied to a MXene electrode.

=== Delamination ===
Ti_{3}C_{2} MXene produced by HF etching has accordion-like morphology with residual forces that keep MXene layers together, preventing separation into individual layers. Despite the weakness of these forces, ultrasound treatment produces only low yields of single-layer flakes. For large scale delamination, DMSO is intercalated into ML-MXene powders under constant stirring to further weaken the interlayer bonding and then delaminated with ultrasound treatment. This results in large scale layer separation and formation of the colloidal solutions of the FL-MXene. These solutions can later be filtered to prepare MXene "paper" (similar to Graphene oxide paper).

== MXene clay ==
For the case of Ti_{3}C_{2}T_{x} and Ti_{2}CT_{x}, etching with concentrated hydrofluoric acid leads to an open, accordion-like morphology with a short distance between layers (this is common for other MXene compositions). To be dispersed in suspension, the material must be pre-intercalated with something like DMSO. However, when etching is conducted with hydrochloric acid and LiF as a fluoride source, morphology is more compact with a larger inter-layer spacing, presumably due to intercalated water. The material has been found to be 'clay-like': as seen in clay materials (e.g. smectite clays and kaolinite), Ti_{3}C_{2}T_{x} demonstrates the ability to expand its interlayer distance hydration and can reversibly exchange charge-balancing Group I and Group II cations. Further, when hydrated, the MXene clay becomes pliable and can be molded into desired shapes, becoming a hard solid upon drying. Unlike most clays, however, MXene clay shows high electrical conductivity upon drying and is hydrophilic. It disperses into single layer two-dimensional sheets in water without surfactants. Further, due to these properties, it can be rolled into free-standing, additive-free electrodes for energy storage applications.

== Material processing ==
MXenes can be solution-processed in aqueous or polar organic solvents, such as water, ethanol, dimethyl formamide, propylene carbonate, etc., enabling various types of deposition via vacuum filtration, spin coating, spray coating, dip coating, and roll casting. Studies considered ink-jet printing of additive free Ti_{3}C_{2}T_{x} inks and inks composed of Ti_{3}C_{2}T_{x} and proteins.

Lateral flake size plays a role in the observed properties. Several synthetic routes produce varying flake sizes. For example, when HF is used as an etchant, the intercalation and delamination step require sonication to exfoliate material into single flakes. The resulting flakes are several hundreds of nanometers in lateral size. This is beneficial for applications such as catalysis and specific biomedical and electrochemical applications. However, if larger flakes are warranted, especially for electronic or optical applications, defect-free, large area flakes are necessary. This can be achieved by Minimally Intensive Layer Delamination (MILD), where the quantity of LiF to MAX phase is scaled up resulting in flakes that can be delminated in situ when washing to neutral pH.

Post-synthesis processing techniques to tailor the flake size include sonication, differential centrifugation, and density gradient centrifugation procedures. Post processing methods rely heavily on the as-produced flake size.

Sonication can decrease flake size from 4.4 μm (as-produced), to an average of 1.0 μm after 15 minutes of bath sonication (100 W, 40 kHz), down to 350 nm after 3 hours of bath sonication. By utilizing probe sonication (8 s ON, 2 s OFF pulse, 250 W), flakes can be reduced to an average of 130 nm in lateral size. Differential centrifugation, also known as cascading centrifugation, can be used to select flakes based on lateral size by increasing the centrifuge speed sequentially from low speeds (e.g. 1000 rpm) to high speeds (e.g., 10000 rpm) and collecting the sediment. Large (800 nm), "medium" (300 nm) and "small" (110 nm) flakes can be obtained. Density gradient centrifugation applies a density gradient in the centrifuge tube. Flakes move through the centrifuge tube at different rates based on the relative flake density. To sort MXenes, a sucrose and water density gradient can be used from 10 to 66 w/v %. Using density gradients allows for more mono-disperse distributions in flake sizes and studies show the flake distribution can be varied from 100 to 10 μm without employing sonication.

== Properties ==
With a high electron density at the Fermi level, MXene monolayers are predicted to be metallic. In MAX phases, N(E_{F}) is mostly M 3d orbitals, and the valence states below E_{F} are composed of two sub-bands. Sub-band A is made of hybridized Ti 3d-Al 3p orbitals, and is near E_{F}, while sub-band B, −10 to −3 eV below E_{F}, which is due to hybridized Ti 3d-C 2p and Ti 3d-Al 3s orbitals. Sub-band A is the source of Ti-Al bonds, while sub-band B is the source of Ti-C bond. Removing A layers causes the Ti 3d states to be redistributed from missing Ti-Al bonds to delocalized Ti-Ti metallic bond states near the Fermi energy in Ti_{2}, therefore N(E_{F}) is 2.5–4.5 times higher for MXenes than MAX phases. Experimentally, the predicted higher N(E_{F}) for MXenes has not been shown to lead to higher resistivities than the corresponding MAX phases. The energy positions of the O 2p (~6 eV) and the F 2p (~9 eV) bands from the Fermi level of Ti_{2}CT_{x} and Ti_{3}C_{2}T_{x} both depend on the adsorption sites and the bond lengths to the termination species. Significant changes in the Ti-O/F coordination are observed with increasing temperature in the heat treatment. The anisotropic electronic band structure of Ti_{3}C_{2}T_{x} contains electron pockets, bulk band gaps, and a Dirac-like feature.

Only MXenes without surface terminations are predicted to be magnetic. E.g., Cr_{2}C, Cr_{2}N, and Ta_{3}C_{2} are predicted to be ferromagnetic; Ti_{3}C_{2} and Ti_{3}N_{2} are predicted to be anti-ferromagnetic. No magnetic properties have been demonstrated experimentally.

=== Optical ===
Membranes of MXenes, such as Ti_{3}C_{2} and Ti_{2}C, have dark colors, indicating their strong light absorption in the visible wavelengths. MXenes are promising photo-thermal materials due to their strong visible light absorption. The optical properties of MXenes such as Ti_{3}C_{2} and Ti_{2}C in the IR region differ from those in the visible wavelengths. For the wavelengths above 1.4 micrometer, these materials show negative permittivity, resulting in a strong metallic response to infrared light (IR). In other words, they are highly reflective to IR lights. From Kirchhoff's law of radiation, low IR absorption means low IR emissivity. MXenes show IR emissivity as low as 0.1, similar to some metals. Such materials that are visibly black but white under IR are highly desired in many areas, such as camouflage, thermal management, and information encryption.

=== Corrosion resistance ===
MXenes can act as corrosion inhibitors. Ti_{3}C_{2}T_{x}'s corrosion resistance can be attributed to the synergy of good dispersibility, barrier effect and corrosion inhibitor release.

=== Biological properties ===
Compared to graphene oxide, which has antibacterial properties, Ti_{2}C MXene does not. However, MXene of Ti_{3}C_{2} MXene shows a higher antibacterial efficiency toward both Gram-negative E. coli and Gram-positive B. subtilis. More than 98% of both bacterial cells lost viability at 200 μg/mL Ti_{3}C_{2} colloidal solution within 4 h of exposure. Damage to the cell membrane was observed, which resulted in release of cytoplasmic materials from the cells and cell death. The principal in vitro studies of cytotoxicity of 2D MXene sheets showed promise for applications in bioscience and biotechnology. Studies of anticancer activity of Ti_{3}C_{2} was determined on two normal (MRC-5 and HaCaT) and two cancerous (A549 and A375) cell lines. Cytotoxicity results indicated that the observed toxic effects were higher against cancerous cells compared to normal ones. Potential toxicity mechanisms include, e.g., that Ti_{3}C_{2} MXene may affect oxidative stress and, in consequence, the generation of reactive oxygen species (ROS). Further studies on Ti_{3}C_{2} MXene revealed the potential of MXenes as a novel ceramic photothermal agent in cancer therapy. In neuronal biocompatibility studies, neurons cultured on Ti_{3}C_{2} are as viable as those in control cultures, and they can adhere, grow axonal processes, and form functional networks. A 2025 study extended this work for the first time to astrocytes, showing that physiologically relevant concentrations of Ti_{3}C_{2}T_{x} MXene flakes are biocompatible, with preserved cell viability, morphology, and calcium signaling in astrocyte cultures.

== Potential applications ==
As conductive layered materials with tunable surface terminations, MXenes show potential for energy storage applications (Li-ion batteries, supercapacitors, and energy storage components), composites, photocatalysis, water purification, gas sensors, transparent conducting electrodes, neural electrodes, as a metamaterial, SERS substrate, photonic diode, electrochromic device, and triboelectric nanogenerator (TENGs).

=== Lithium-ion batteries ===
In lithium-ion batteries (LIBs) V_{2}CT_{x}, Nb_{2}CT_{x}, Ti_{2}CT_{x}, and Ti_{3}C_{2}T_{x} have been examined. V_{2}CT_{x} demonstrated the highest reversible charge storage capacity in multi-layer form (280 mAhg^{−1} at 1C rate and 125 mAhg^{−1} at 10C rate). Multi-layer Nb_{2}CT_{x} showed a stable, reversible capacity of 170 mAhg^{−1} at 1C rate and 110 mAhg^{−1}at a 10C. Although Ti_{3}C_{2}T_{x} showed the lowest capacity among the four MXenes in multi-layer form, it can be delaminated. By virtue of higher electrochemically active and accessible surface area, delaminated Ti_{3}C_{2}T_{x}paper demonstrates a reversible capacity of 410 mAhg^{−1} at 1C and 110 mAhg^{−1} at 36C rate. Generally, M_{2}X can be expected to have greater capacity than their M_{3}X_{2}or M_{4}X_{3} counterparts at the same applied current, since M_{2}X MXenes have the fewest atomic layers per sheet.

In addition to high power capabilities, each MXene has a different active voltage window, which could allow their use as battery cathodes/anodes. Moreover, the experimentally measured capacity for Ti_{3}C_{2}T_{x} paper is higher than predicted from computer simulations, indicating that further investigation is required to ascertain the charge storage mechanism.

=== Sodium-ion batteries ===
MXenes exhibit promising performances for sodium-ion batteries. Na^{+} should diffuse rapidly on MXene surfaces, which is favorable for fast charging/discharging. Two layers of Na^{+} can be intercalated in between MXene layers. As a typical example, multilayered Ti_{2}CT_{x} MXene as a negative electrode material showed a capacity of 175 mA h g^{−1} and good rate capability. It is possible to tune the Na-ion insertion potentials of MXenes by changing the transition metal and surface functional groups. V_{2}CT_{x} MXene has been successfully applied as a cathode material. Porous MXene-based paper electrodes were reported to exhibit high volumetric capacities and stable cycling performance, demonstrating promise for devices where size matters.

=== Supercapacitors ===
MXenes are under study to improve supercapacitor energy density. Improvements come from increased charge storage density, which can be increased in several ways. Increasing the available surface area for potential redox reactions through increasing interlayer spacing can accommodate more ions, but reduces electrode density. The synthesis route controls the surface chemistry and plays a large role in determining the intercalation reaction rate and the charge storage density. For example, molten salt prepared Ti_{3}C_{2}T_{x} MXenes, with chlorine surface groups, show a capacity of 142 mAh g^{−1} at 13C rate and 75 mAh g^{−1} at 128C rate, driven by full desolvation of Li^{+}, allowing for increased charge storage density in the electrode. In comparison, Ti_{3}C_{2}T_{x} MXenes prepared through HF etching show a capacity of 107.2 mAh g^{−1} at 1C.

Composite Ti_{3}C_{2}T_{x}-based electrodes, including Ti_{3}C_{2}T_{x}/polymer (e.g. PPy, Polyaniline), Ti_{3}C_{2}T_{x} /TiO_{2}, and Ti_{3}C_{2}T_{x}/Fe_{2}O_{3} have been explored. Notably, Ti_{3}C_{2}T_{x} hydrogel electrodes delivered a high volumetric capacitance of up to 1500 F/cm^{3}.

Supercapacitor electrodes based on Ti_{3}C_{2}T_{x} MXene paper in aqueous solutions demonstrate excellent cyclability and the ability to store 300-400 F/cm^{3}, which translates to three times as much energy as for activated carbon and graphene-based capacitors. Ti_{3}C_{2} clay showed a volumetric capacitance of 900 F/cm^{3}, a higher capacitance per unit of volume than most other materials, without losing any of its capacitance through more than 10,000 charge/discharge cycles.

In Ti_{3}C_{2}T_{x} MXene electrodes for lithium-ion electrolytes, the choice of solvent greatly affected the ion transport and intercalation kinetics. In a propylene carbonate (PC) solvent, efficient desolvation of lithium ions during intercalation led to increased volumetric charge storage, with negligible increase in electrode volume. The improved kinetics garnered through solvent choice led to improved charge storage density when comparing the PC system to acetonitrile or dimethyl sulfoxide by a factor greater than 2.

=== Composites ===
FL-Ti_{3}C_{2} (the most studied MXene) nanosheets can mix intimately with polymers such as polyvinyl alcohol (PVA), forming alternating MXene-PVA layered structures. The electrical conductivities of the composites can be controlled from 4×10^{−4} to 220 S/cm (MXene weight content from 40% to 90%). The composites have tensile strength up to 400% greater than pure MXene films and show better capacitance up to 500 F/cm^{3}. By using electrostatic self-assembly, flexible and conductive MXene/graphene supercapacitor electrodes can be produced. Free-standing MXene/graphene electrode displays a volumetric capacitance of 1040 F/cm^{3}, an impressive rate capability with 61% capacitance retention and in long cycle life. Alternative filtration for forming MXene-carbon nanomaterials composite films is available. These composites show better rate performance at high scan rates in supercapacitors. The insertion of polymers or carbon nanomaterials between MXene layers enables electrolyte ions to diffuse more easily through the MXenes, which is key for their applications in flexible energy storage devices. The mechanical properties of epoxy/MXenes is comparable to graphene and carbon nanotubes (CNT), the tensile strength and modulus can increase up to 67% and 23% respectively. MXene/C-dot nanocomposites are reported to exhibit synergistic optical absorption and thermal properties of MXene and C-dot nanomaterials.

=== Sensors ===
MXenes-based sensors have been considered for various sensor applications, including gas, biologicals, and surface-enhanced Raman scattering. Ti_{3}C_{2}T_{x} may be applicable in sensing salicylic acid, a metabolite of acetylsalicylic acid (aspirin), organic dye molecules, and biomolecules.

MXene-based gas sensors were reported to exhibit high sensitivity and selectivity towards various gases, including ammonia, alcohols, nitrogen dioxide, and sulfur dioxide. Such sensors can be used for environmental monitoring, industrial safety, and healthcare.

=== Porous materials ===
Porous MXenes (Ti_{3}C_{2}, Nb_{2}C and V_{2}C) can be produced via a facile chemical etching method at ambient temperature. Porous Ti_{3}C_{2} has a larger specific surface area and more open structure, and can be filtered as flexible films with or without CNTs. As-fabricated p-Ti_{3}C_{2}/CNT films were reported to show significantly improved lithium ion storage capabilities, with a capacity as high as 1250 mA·h·g^{−1} at 0.1 C, excellent cycling stability, and good rate performance.

=== Antennas ===
A 2018 study reported MXene use as paint-on antennas perform as well as antennas found in phones, routers and other gadgets.

=== Optoelectronic devices ===
MXene SERS substrates have been manufactured by spray-coating and were used to detect several common dyes, with calculated enhancement factors reaching ~10^{6}. Titanium carbide MXene demonstrates SERS in aqueous colloidal solutions, suggesting the potential for biomedical or environmental applications, where MXene can selectively enhance positively charged molecules. Transparent conducting electrodes have been fabricated with titanium carbide MXene, showing the ability to transmit approximately 97% of visible light per nanometer thickness. The performance of MXene transparent conducting electrodes depends on MXene composition as well as synthesis and processing parameters.

=== Superconductivity ===
Nb_{2}C MXenes exhibit surface-group-dependent superconductivity.

=== Water purification ===
Ti_{3}C_{2} MXenes have been used as flowing electrodes in a flow-electrode capacitive deionization cell for the removal of ammonia from simulated wastewater. MXene FE-CDI demonstrated a 100x improvement in ion absorption capacity at 10x greater energy efficiency as compared to activated carbon flowing electrodes. One-micron-thick Ti_{3}C_{2} MXene membranes demonstrated ultrafast water flux (approximately 38 L/(Bar·h·m^{2})) and differential sieving of salts depending on the hydration radius and ion charge. Cations larger than the interlayer spacing of MXene do not permeate through Ti_{3}C_{2} membranes. As for smaller cations, the ones with a larger charge permeate an order of magnitude slower than single-charged cations.
