= Anhysteresis =

Non-hysteretic magnetization of ferromagnets

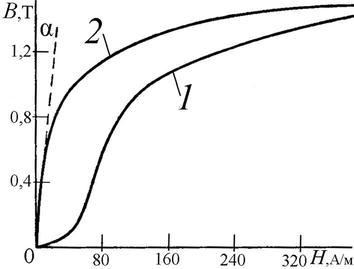
Basic magnetization (1) and anhysteretic magnetization (2) curves for pure iron. The curves vary with magnetic induction (B) on Y-axis and magnetic field (H) (constant field superimposed by alternating field) on X-axis.

Anhysteresis is the reversible magnetized state of ferromagnetic materials in an applied alternate magnetic field and a low but constant magnetic field which does not form a closed hysteresis loop. This is achieved in the absence of domain wall pinning. Ideally no coercive force is present in the state. As no magnetic materials naturally possess anhysteresis, its concept is used in developing theoretical models to observe hysteresis which is a natural occurring state in ferromagnetic materials. Anhysteretic Remanent Magnetization (ARM) is a commonly used parameter in geological mineral studies which is related to this phenomenon. A defining feature of anhysteretic magnetization curves is that it does not have an inflection point and angle of inclination to Y-axis is usually small.

== Etymology and history ==
It is derived by joining the Greek prefix an meaning "not" and hysteresis, an Ancient Greek word meaning "deficiency" or "lagging behind". Hysteresis was coined by Sir James Alfred Ewing to describe the behavior of magnetic materials. Collectively, anhysteresis means not to lag behind that contrasts to the behavior in hysteretic materials. This means that the state of an anhysteretic system doesn't depend on its history and only on the externally applied magnetic field $B$.

Early research on anhysteretic magnetization was done by Louis Néel in the 1940s where on applying an external demagnetizing field $H$ and ac field $h$ to a multidomain material, the magnetization $J$ remained frozen for some magnetic domains and kept alternating between $+J_1$ and $-J_1$ for others. On reversing the EM field from $+h$ to $-h$, the number of frozen domains increased until all the domains were frozen. For frozen domains, the magnetization increases from zero to $J_0$ and for yet to freeze domains, the magnetization would decrease alternatingly until $J_1$ drops to zero. The net magnetization varies thus varies between $J + J_1$ and $J - J_1$ while the total field acting on the material varies between $H_0 + h - N(J + J_1)$ and $H_0 - h - N(J - J_1)$.

This was followed by rock studies in the 1960s–1970s which determined the useful applications of anhysteretic remanent magnetization in knowing the magnetic properties of certain rock minerals. Demagnetisation to remove isothermal remanent magnetisation thus became a common practice in future rock studies.

== Anhysteretic magnetisation of ferromagnetic materials ==
In pure magnetic studies concerning the magnetization and de-magnetization of ferromagnetic materials, the below different models had been used to deduce the anhysteretic nature of magnetic bodies. This development coincides with the hysteretic observation as well in magnetism. From these models, the anhysteretic magnetisation value in ferromagnets $M_{an}$ and the anhysteretic magnetization curve that is distinct from the hysteresis loop are determined.

=== Brillouin and Langevin functions ===
It describes the reversible magnetic transformation in paramagnetic materials in which magnetic material is treated as a net sum of neutral domains while each domain is carrying a dipolar magnetic moment. When an external field $H$ is applied, the domains become aligned in the direction of applied field. This is because an equilibrium is established between thermal agitation and the magnetic moments. The resulting magnetization $M$ becomes:

$M = Nm_d \langle \cos(\theta) \rangle$

where $N$ is the number of domains, $m_d$ is the magnetic moment and $\langle \cos (\theta) \rangle$ is the statistical average of $m_d$ along the direction of applied magnetic field. The product $Nm_d$ is the saturation value of $M_s$ which occurs on full magnetization of the material.

Hence, it is possible to describe the anhysteretic magnetization (or reduced magnetization) $M$ of ferromagnetic materials for every value of externally applied magnetic field by a Langevin function $L$.

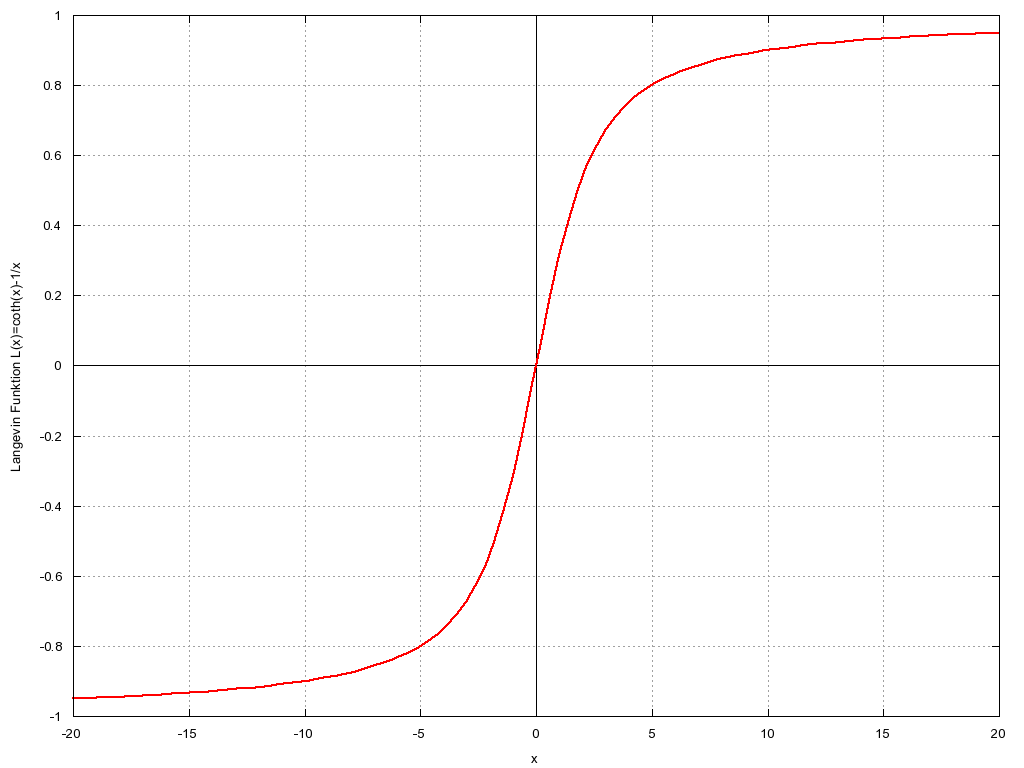
Sigmoid curve of Langevin-Weiss function

$M = M_s{\left[{\coth\biggl({H \over a}\biggr)}- \biggl({a \over H}\biggr)\right]} = M_sL\biggl({H \over a}\biggr)$

where the parameter $a$ (units A/m) that characterizes the shape of anhysteretic magnetization curve is defined as:

$a = {k_B T \over \mu_0 m_d} = {N k_B T \over \mu_0 M_s}$ when $m_d = {M_s \over N}$

and $L\biggl({H \over a}\biggr) = \operatorname{coth}{\biggl({H \over a}\biggr)} - \biggl({a \over H}\biggr)$

To describe this magnetisation for ferromagnetic materials e.g. Iron or Copper, Weiss considered the internal magnetic field (or molecular field) other than externally applied magnetic field $H$. This builds the equation for magnetization in Langevin–Weiss model.

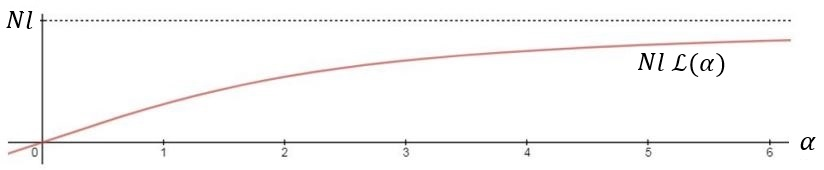
Anhysteretic magnetization curve seen in Langevin function when molecular field is also taken.

$M = M_sL\biggl({H + \alpha M \over a}\biggr)$

This $\alpha$ is positive for real ferromagnets while negative in value for anhysteretic ferromagnets which was seen in observation by Heisenberg while formulating the value of inter domain coupling coefficient $\alpha$:

$\alpha = {2z \over N g^2 \mu^2_B} J_0$

where $z$ is the number of nearest neighbors, $g$ is the Landé splitting factor, $\mu_B$ is the Bohr magneton and $J_0$ is the exchange integral.

A Brillouin function $B_J$ is simply the limiting case of Langevin function when $J \rightarrow \infty$ and using it the anhysteretic magnetization $M_{an}$ becomes:

$M_{an} = M_sB_J(y)$

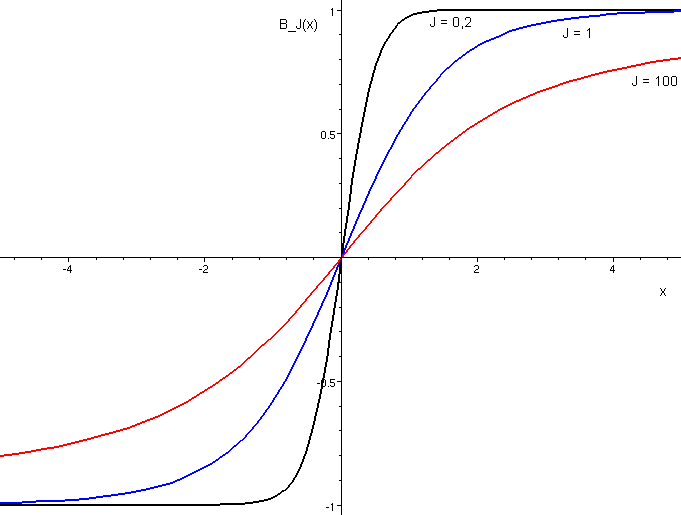
Brillouin curves for different values of J

where $B_J(y) = {{2J + 1 \over 2J} \coth\biggl({2J + 1 \over 2J}y\biggr)} - {1 \over 2J} {\coth\biggl({1 \over 2J}y\biggr)}$ and $y = \biggl({H + \alpha M \over a}\biggr)$

The quantum number $J$ is also determined using the magnetic moment $m_d$ equation which is:

$m_d = Jg\mu_B$

At $0$ Kelvins, the average magnetic moment for silicon-iron sheet is $18.056 \times 10^-24 \, A/m^2$ which is 1.947 times $\mu_B$. This gives a value of Landé factor g as 2 and subsequently $J$ as 0.9735.

=== Preisach model ===
Irreversible magnetic transformations are studied in this model according to which the ferromagnetic material has zero magnetic moment because of equal distribution of independent domains by having internal magnetizations of either $h$ or $-h$.

In normal magnetization of the magnetic material, the magnetization value $M$ depends on externally applied field $H$ at present time $t_0$ and at an earlier time $(t < t_0)$ also. In anhysteretic magnetization when $M$ reaches a saturation value, it can only reduce to $M_{an}$ which will depend on $N$ that is the demagnetization factor. Every material which has different $N$ will result in different levels of $M_{an}$ upon degaussing or applying $H$. Thus for some Preisach distributions, $M_{an}$ is independent of $N$ while for others it is highly dependent on $N$. Also a new magnetization curve $M_{an}(H)$ is observed.

The internal field $H_i$ governing the Preisach operators is measured as:

$H_i = H - NM$

A relative permeability for anhysteretic magnetization $\mu_{an}(N)$ is also observed in the Preisach model that is different from relative permeability for normal magnetization $\mu$.

$\mu = {1 \over \mu_0}{\biggl({dB \over dH} \biggr)}$

$\mu_{an}(N) = {[\exp(N\mu_{an(0)} - 1] \over N}$

=== Jiles–Atherton model ===
The JA model is different for isotropic and anisotropic materials such that the net anhysteretic magnetization depends on sum of isotropic and anisotropic anhysteretic magnetizations. It is experimentally obtained by reducing the constant externally applied magnetic field $H$ which is applied with a varying external magnetic field. This varying field keeps changing between minimum and maximum as its range steadily decreases until a point is reached when it aligns with $H$. At such a point, anhysteresis (or hysteresis free) ferromagnetic material would have been achieved.

Isotropic anhysteretic magnetisation is defined as:

$M_{an(iso)} = M_s{\left[{\coth\biggl({H \over a}\biggr)}- \biggl({a \over H}\biggr)\right]}$ which is similar to the one given by Langevin function.

Anisotropic anhysteretic magnetization is defined as:

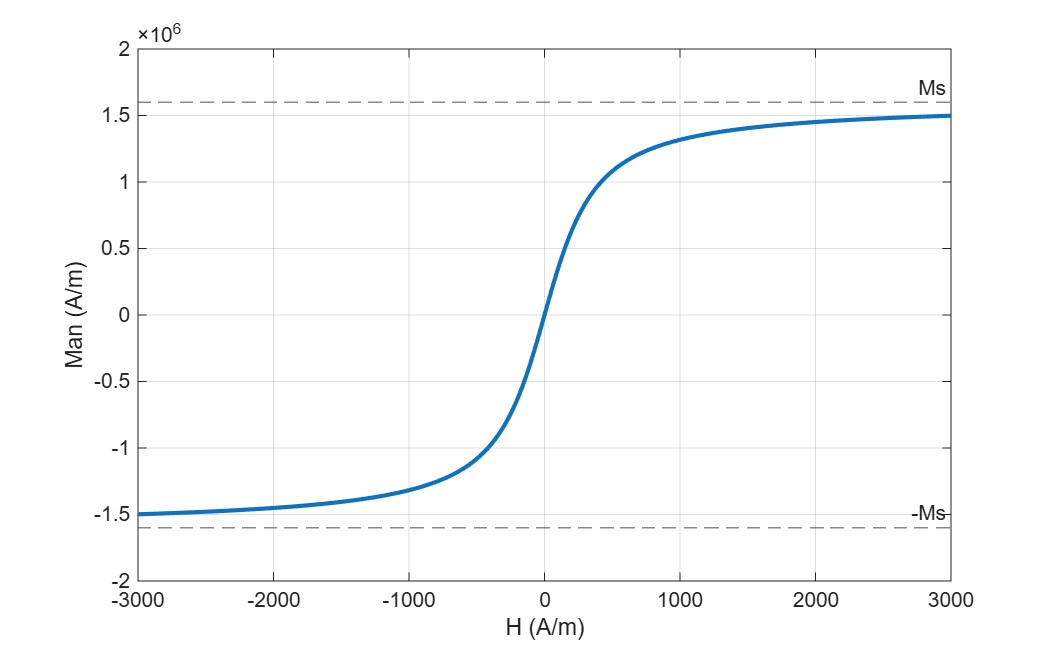
Jiles-Atherton graph with varying anhysteretic magnetization values M_an as a function of external magnetic field H

$M_{an(aniso)} = M_s{\int\limits^\pi_0{e^{E(1) + E(2) \over 2} \sin(\theta) \cdot \cos(\theta) \cdot d(\theta)} \over \int\limits^\pi_0{e^{E(1) + E(2) \over 2} \sin(\theta) \cdot d(\theta)}}$

Total anhysteretic magnetization in JA model thus becomes:

$M_{an(tot)} = (1-t)M_{an(iso)} + t M_{an(aniso)}$

The magnetisation $M$ of ferromagnetic materials as a function of externally applied field $H$ is dependent on $M_{an}(H)$ which is the anhysteretic magnetisation as a function of $H$.

${dM \over dH} = {1 \over 1 + c} {{M_{an}(H) - M} \over {\delta k - \alpha ({M_{an}(H) - M})}} + {c \over 1 + c} {dM_{an}(H) \over dH}$

where $M_{an}(H) = M_s\biggl(\coth\biggl({{H + \alpha M} \over \alpha_J }\biggr) - { \alpha_J \over {H + \alpha M}}\biggr)$

Also it is possible to know the anhysteretic differential susceptibility $\chi_{an}$ as well as the magnetic moment $m_d$ of the ferromagnetic material for every value $H_a$ of the externally applied field $H$. For this, linearized approximation of $M_{an}(H)$ would be needed to be taken as externally varying magnetic field approaches smaller but constant external magnetic field $H_a$

$H \approx H_a$

$M_{an}(H) \approx M_s \biggl(\operatorname{coth}\biggl({H_a \over a}\biggr)- {a \over H_a}\biggr)$

Using linearized approximation we get, $M^a_{an}(H) = {M_s \over 3}{\mu_0 m_1 \over k_B T} H_a$

$\chi^a_{an} = {M^a_{an} \over H_a}$

and $m_1 = {3k_B T \chi^a_{an} \over \mu_0 M_s}$

== Anhysteretic remanent magnetization ==
Remanence is the residual magnetization of a magnetic body after the saturation point of magnetization $M_s$ has been reached. Rocks are having a natural remanent magnetization such that even without applying any magnetic field onto it, the constituent rock particles create a magnetization property in it. These particles are of three magnetic grain sizes—single domain, pseudo–single domain and multi domain grains.

Anhysteretic Remanent Magnetization (ARM) is obtained by applying a large alternating magnetic field and a small constant DC bias while the alternating field is gradually reduced to zero. Unlike the Isothermal Remanent Magnetization, the magnetic strength with applied weak fields is larger in ARM. The remanence coercivity fraction also differs in both. Using Lowrie-Fuller test, there is a difference between ARM and other remanent magnetizations such as saturation isothermal remanent magnetization and thermoremanent magnetization.

To study the different properties of cut rock grains, usually anisotropy of anhysteretic remanent magnetization is involved. It has few features such as tumbling demagnetization, imparting of anhysteretic remanent magnetization in the presence of a decaying alternating field, and lastly, determination of anisotropy of remanence by measurements of the imparted anhysteretic remanence in different sample directions.

== See also ==
- Hysteresis
- Magnetism
- Order Differential Equations
