= EFC =

EFC may refer to:

== Education ==
- Education Facilities Clearinghouse, United States
- Encampment for Citizenship, an American youth organization
- European Film College, in Ebeltoft, Danmark
- Expected Family Contribution, to United States student financial aid

== Religion ==
- Evangelical Fellowship of Canada
- Evangelical Free Church (disambiguation)

== Sport ==
- European Football Clubs, an independent body for football clubs within Europe

=== Combat sports ===
- Eagle Fighting Championship, a Russian mixed martial arts promotion
- European Fencing Championships
- Extreme Fighting Championship, a South African MMA promotion

=== Football clubs ===
- Eastleigh F.C., Hampshire, England
- Epping Football Club, Australia
- Essendon Football Club, Australia
- Esteghlal F.C., Iran
- Étoile FC, Singapore
- Europa F.C., Gibraltar
- Everton F.C., Liverpool, England

== Technology ==
- Electrochemical flow capacitor, energy storage device
- Electronic fee collection, on transport
- Electronic Frontier Canada, a Canadian e-rights organization
- EFC shutter, in photography
- Equivalent firm capacity, in electricity generation

== Other uses ==
- East Falls Church station, on the Washington Metro
- Economic and Financial Committee (European Union)
- Edmonton Flying Club, in Canada
- Emergency Fleet Corporation, now the United States Shipping Board Merchant Fleet Corporation
- Expansionary fiscal contraction
- Experience Focused Counselling
- Belle Fourche Municipal Airport, in South Dakota US (FAA Identifier EFC)
