= International Council =

International Council may refer to:

== Religion ==
- International Bahá'í Council, an administrative institution of the Bahá'í Faith
- International Council of Christians and Jews, an umbrella organization of 38 national groups in 32 countries worldwide engaged in the Christian-Jewish dialogue
- International Council of Community Churches, a Christian denomination of ecumenically co-operating mainline Protestants and Independent Catholics based in Frankfort, Illinois
- International council of the United Methodist Church in Germany, a pilot project approved by the United Methodist General Conference in 1988
- International Council of Unitarians and Universalists, a world council bringing together Unitarians, Universalists and Unitarian Universalists
- International Council of Universities of Saint Thomas Aquinas, a worldwide network of universities inspired by the thought of Santo Tomás de Aquino
- International Lutheran Council, a worldwide association of confessional Lutheran denominations

== Science ==
- International Council for the Exploration of the Sea, a modern intergovernmental organisation that promotes marine research in the North Atlantic
- International Council on Nanotechnology, a multistakeholder group dedicated to developing and communicating information on nano risks
- International Council for Science, an international non-governmental organization devoted to international co-operation in the advancement of science
- International Council of Societies of Industrial Design, a global organisation that promotes better design around the world
- International Council on Systems Engineering, a non-profit membership organization dedicated to the advancement of systems engineering
- International Social Science Council, an international organisation that aims to promote the social and behavioural sciences

== Sports ==
- International Australian Football Council, a body established in 1995 to govern the sport of Australian rules football internationally
- International Cricket Council, the international governing body of cricket

== Other ==
- International Council Correspondence, a council communist journal
- International Council of Cruise Lines, a non-profit trade association which represents the interests of 16 passenger cruise lines
- International Council on Educational Credential Evaluation, an international NGO closely affiliated both with UNESCO and the Council of Europe
- International Council for Game and Wildlife Conservation, a politically independent advisory body internationally active on a non-profit basis
- International Council of Jewish Parliamentarians (ICJP), a project supported by the Knesset, the World Jewish Congress, the Israeli Ministry of Foreign Affairs and the Israel Forum
- International Council on Monuments and Sites, a professional association that works for the conservation and protection of cultural heritage places around the world
- International Council of Museums, an international organization of museums and museum professionals which is committed to the conservation, continuation and communication to society of the world's natural and cultural heritage
- International Council of Nurses, a federation of more than 120 national nurses associations
- International Council of Women, a non-governmental organization
- International Code Council, a United States-based non-governmental organization which allows U.S. jurisdictions and other stakeholders to collaborate in the creation of model building codes and other building safety related standards
- International Dance Council, an umbrella organization for all forms of dance in the world
- International Music Council, UNESCO's advisory body on matters of music
- International Press Telecommunications Council, a consortium of the world's major news agencies and news industry vendors
- International Rehabilitation Council for Torture Victims, an independent, international health professional organisation that promotes and supports the rehabilitation of torture victims and works for the prevention of torture worldwide
- International Risk Governance Council, an independent foundation which aims to support governments, business and other organizations and to foster public confidence in risk governance and in related decision-making
- International Spiritist Council, an organization founded on November 28, 1992
- International Tin Council, an organisation which acted on behalf of the principal tin producers in Cornwall and Malaysia to buy up surplus tin stocks to maintain the price at a steady level
- International Wheat Council, an international organization established on March 23, 1949 at the initiative of the U.S. government for the purpose of egalitarian distribution of wheat to countries in a state of emergency
