= International Council of the United Methodist Church in Germany =

The International Council of the United Methodist Church in Germany (Internationaler Ausschuss) grew out of a pilot project approved by the United Methodist General Conference in 1988. It involved cooperation of three general agencies of the church (Discipleship, Chaplaincy and Global Ministries) and the United Methodist Central Conference in the Federal Republic of Germany and West Berlin.

Bishop Hermann Sticher DD was an initiator of the work. Bishop Dr. Walter Klaiber presided over most of its life. Bishop Rosemarie Wenner was elected bishop for the Central Conference and assumed the chair in 2006. One intention of the Council — originally known as the "German-American Council" — was to provide "points of contact" between members of the Methodist Church (Great Britain) and the United Methodist Church (USA) moving in and out of Germany and members of the German United Methodist congregations (Evangelisch-methodistische Kirche). Another intention involved strategic planting of English-language United Methodist congregations within German-language church structures, as had previously been done in Vienna, Austria, by the Austria Provisional Annual Conference of the United Methodist Church in the Central Conference of Central and South-eastern Europe.

The Council meets normally once or twice a year with German and international representatives from the various regions (Annual Conferences) of the German church and the U.S. church agencies.

The work of the council has been carried out and supervised primarily by a director or coordinator based at the Bishop's Office in Frankfurt. The first person to exercise the function, even before the position was created, was Rev. Ray Bell, a United Methodist military chaplain. He was succeeded by former chaplain Dan Franks and spouse Sue, who served three years. Rev. Cheryl Rhodes served as interim coordinator until the position was filled. Rev. Sonja Waldmann-Bohn served for several years before the position was left temporarily vacant. Rev. Sam Greening filled the office for two years from 2002 to 2004 and from 2007 to 2014 the Rev. Carol Seckel. Since mid-2014, the Rev. George A. Miller is the coordinator for Methodist International and Migrant Ministries in the Frankfurt Area office.

With the internationalization of Europe, several English-language United Methodist congregations have developed alongside the many international congregations of other origin in Europe. In Germany, such congregations now exist in Munich, Hamburg, Berlin and Düsseldorf. Additionally, congregations founded in cooperation with the Methodist Church - Ghana exist in Hamburg, Düsseldorf, Essen, Cologne, Stuttgart and Frankfurt.

== Pastors ==
Pastors who have served these congregations (and their countries of origin) follow:

- In Munich: Rev. Cheryl Rhodes and spouse Robert (USA), founding pastor; Rev. Richard Acosta and spouse Lena (USA and Germany); Rev. Dr. James Dwyer and spouse Helen (USA); Rev. Christine Erb-Kanzleiter (Germany).
- In Hamburg: Rev. Dr. Egon Gerdes (Germany and USA) and spouse Rev. Dorothea Dudley (USA); Rev. Thomas Shaw and spouse Susan (USA); Rev. Dr. James Dwyer and spouse Helen (USA); Rev. Dr. Krista S. Givens (USA).
- In Berlin: Rev. John Atkinson and spouse Lynda (Great Britain); Mr. Romesh Modayil (India).
- In Düsseldorf: Rev. Linda Pliska (USA); Rev. Robert Schwartz (USA), Rev. Van Jollie (USA and Germany)
- Ghanaian pastors have included Rev. John Ekem, Rev. Isaac Amoah, Rev. Kwasi Owusu-Acheaw, Rev. Clarence Antwi-Boasiakoh, Rt. Rev. Albert Ofoe Wright, Rev. Jane Ellen Odoom and V. Rev. Conrad Roberts.
