= Walter Klaiber =

German theologian

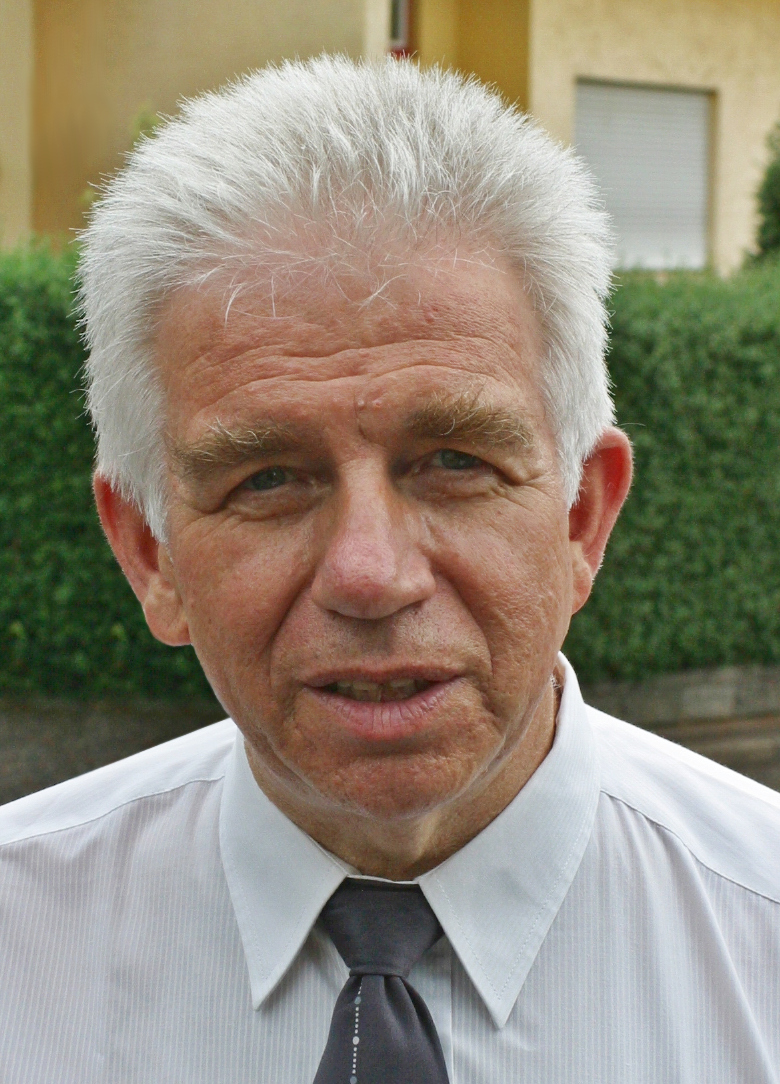

Personal life
- Born: April 17, 1940 (age 86) Ulm
- Education: Theological seminary of the Evangelical Methodist Church; University of Tübingen; University of Göttingen
- Occupation: theologian

Religious life
- Church: Evangelical Methodist Church
- Ordination: 1966

Senior posting
- Post: bishop
- Successor: Rosemarie Wenner

Walter Klaiber (born April 17, 1940 in Ulm) is a theologian, bishop of the Evangelical Methodist Church in Germany and was until the beginning of March 2007 Chairman of the Working Group of Christian Churches in Germany.

== Bibliography ==
=== Studies and academic career ===
Walter Klaiber studied Protestant theology at the Theological seminary of the Evangelical Methodist Church (EmK) in Reutlingen, at the University of Tübingen and at the University of Göttingen. From 1969 to 1971 he was a research assistant at Ernst Käsemann in Tübingen. Klaiber did his doctorate there in 1972 on Die Bedeutung der iustificatio impii für die Ekklesiologie des Paulus [The importance of the justification of the ungodly for the ecclesiology of Paul].

=== Pastoral ministry ===
In 1966 Klaiber became ordained pastor of the Evangelical Association. In 1968 the Evangelical Association merged with the Methodist Episcopal Church to form the Evangelical Methodist Church (EmK). From 1971 to 1989 he was a lecturer for New Testament and Ancient Greek at the Theological Seminary in Reutlingen and was appointed its director in 1977.

=== Bishopric ===
In 1989 Walter Klaiber was elected Bishop of the Methodist Evangelical Church in Germany and West Berlin and in 1992 Bishop of the Methodist Episcopal Church (EmK) in Germany, now united. From 1986 to 1992, until the first central conference of the EmK in Germany after German Reunification, Rüdiger Minor was bishop of the EmK in German Democratic Republic (GDR).

In his capacity as bishop, Klaiber represented the Methodist Church in Germany (with at this time 56,000 Methodists) at the World Methodist Council.

From 1989 to 2005 Walter Klaiber was a member of the Presidium of the Association of Free Protestant Churches and its president for nine years. From 1989 to 2007 he was a member of the board of Association of Christian Churches in Germany and was its chairman between 2001 and March 2007. From 1999 to 2009 he was president of the Deutsche Bibelgesellschaft (German Bible Society).

On March 31, 2005, Bishop Klaiber retired. His successor became bishop on April 1, 2005: Rosemarie Wenner.

== Theological contribution ==
Walter Klaiber is the author of works on contemporary Protestant theology, particularly that of Wesleyan-Arminian. For many years he has been co-editor of the ecumenical Bible interpretation Mit der Bibel durch das Jahr [With the Bible through the year]. It is the standard work of the practical ecumenical Bible interpretation for life as a Christian today (1st edition 1994). The interpretations with short prayers for each day follow the ecumenical Bible plan and are written by Catholic, Evangelical and Evangelical Free Church authors. He is the founder and editor of the comment series Die Botschaft des Neuen Testaments [The Message of the New Testament].

In spring 2009 he taught as a visiting professor at Emory University in Atlanta (USA). In 2012 he was awarded the ecumenical sermon price of the publishing house for the German economy for his life's work.

Bishop Klaiber is involved in the Ecumenical Movement. He is a member of the board of trustees of ProChrist, the organizer of an evangelical event with an evangelical orientation that is closely related to YMCA.

== Personal life ==
Walter Klaiber is married to the doctor Annegret Klaiber. The couple have three children and eight grandchildren and live in Tübingen.

== Publications ==
- Die Bedeutung der iustificatio impii für die Ekklesiologie des Paulus. Dissertation. 1971.
- Rechtfertigung und Gemeinde. Eine Untersuchung zum paulinischen Kirchenverständnis. 1982, ISBN 3-525-53296-2.
- Ruf und Antwort. Biblische Grundlagen einer Theologie der Evangelisation. 1990, ISBN 3-7675-7742-9.
- Geschichte Israels. Deutsche Bibelgesellschaft, 1996, ISBN 3-438-06206-2.
- Auf Fels gebaut. Die Bergpredigt. 2001, ISBN 3-438-06216-X.
- Die Schriften der Bibel. 1996, ISBN 978-3-438-06207-9.
- Rechtfertigung und Gemeinde. Eine Untersuchung zum paulinischen Kirchenverständnis. 1996, ISBN 3-525-53296-2.
- Wo Leben wieder Leben ist. Bekehrung, Wiedergeburt, Rechtfertigung, Heiligung: Dimensionen eines Lebens mit Gott. 1984, ISBN 3-7675-3214-X.
- Wer leitet die Kirche? Kirchen- und Gemeindeleitung in der Evangelisch-methodistischen Kirche. 1996, ISBN 3-7675-9105-7.
- Gerecht vor Gott. 2000, ISBN 3-525-61386-5.
- Das Leben teilen. 2000, ISBN 978-3-7675-7069-6.
- Rechtfertigung in freikirchlicher und römisch-katholischer Sicht. 2003, ISBN 978-3-7675-7071-9.
- Schöpfung. 2005, ISBN 978-3-525-61589-8.
- Was mich beschäftigt – Ansichten und Einsichten. 2005, ISBN 3-7675-7075-0.
- Gelebte Gnade. 2. Auflage. 2006, ISBN 978-3-7675-9497-5.
- Die Bibel im Leben der Kirche. 2007, ISBN 978-3-7675-7121-1.
- Streitpunkt Bibel in gerechter Sprache. (With Martin Rösel), 2008, ISBN 978-3-374-02642-5.
- Wie viel Glaube darf es sein? Religion und Mission in unserer Gesellschaft. (With Sabine Plonz as editor), 2008, ISBN 978-3-7831-3045-4.
- Jesu Tod und unser Leben. Was das Kreuz bedeutet. 2011, ISBN 978-3-374-02845-0.
- Methodistische Kirchen. 2011, ISBN 978-3-525-87202-4.
- Zur Freiheit berufen: Die 10 Gebote – Anleitung zu einem gelingendem Leben. 2012, ISBN 978-3-87982-979-8.
- Die biblischen Grundlagen der Rechtfertigungslehre (editor) 2012, ISBN 978-3-374-03083-5.
- Herausgeber der Auslegungsreihe „Die Botschaft des Neuen Testaments“, Vandenhoeck & Ruprecht, Göttingen:
  - Der Römerbrief. 2009, ISBN 978-3-7887-2378-1.
  - Das Markusevangelium. 2010, ISBN 978-3-7887-2454-2.
  - Der erste Korintherbrief. 2011, ISBN 978-3-7887-2540-2.
  - Der zweite Korintherbrief. 2012, ISBN 978-3-7887-2576-1.
  - Der Galaterbrief. 2013, ISBN 978-3-7887-2713-0.
  - Das Matthäusevangelium. Teilband 1: Mt 1,1-16,20. 2015, ISBN 978-3-7887-2894-6.
  - Das Matthäusevangelium. Teilband 2: Mt 16,21-28,20. 2015, ISBN 978-3-7887-2928-8.
  - Das Johannesevangelium. Teilband 1: Joh 1,1 - 10,42. 2017, ISBN 978-3-7887-3121-2.
  - Das Johannesevangelium. Teilband 2: Joh 11,1 - 21,25. 2018, ISBN 978-3-7887-3123-6.
  - Die Offenbarung des Johannes. 2019, ISBN 978-3-7887-3391-9.
