= Porous carbon =

Porous carbons (PCs) are versatile materials with a wide range of applications, including sensors, actuators, thermal insulation, and energy conversion and supercapacitors. Some examples of PCs are graphene and carbon nanotube-based aerogel. Physical properties that make PCs unique are their low density, high conductivity, mechanical flexibility, and stability in extreme environments.

== Mechanical properties ==
To ensure durability of PCs, mechanical properties are important to study. Elaborate efforts have been made for studying compressive brittleness of porous carbon materials. In 1999, Iizuka, et al. studied the mechanical properties of wood ceramics, a type of porous carbon material. Stable medium-density fiber was used as the base material of wood ceramics and phenol resin was impregnated into the board. Starting at 300 °C, Young's modulus and the compressive strength first decreased with increasing temperature, but at 500 °C the strength increases sharply until it reaches 800 °C and plateaus. The effects of temperature were due to microstructural changes in the resin during carbonization. Effects of impregnates phenol resin at 800 °C were also investigated. Results showed that Young's modulus increased with phenol resin impregnation (Figure 1). The maximum Young's modulus was 5 MPa and the maximum compressive strength was 80 MPa. Wall-bending mechanical test were also performed and it was found that cell wall is breakage was correlated to relative density on compressive strength and Young's modulus.

Another type of compressive porous carbon consisting of cellulose and graphene aerogels was studied by Mi, et al. Modified cellulose/graphene aerogels (MCGA) was synthesized via bidirectional freeze drying and grafting of long carbon chains through chemical vapor deposition (Figure 2). The final product had a bulk density of 5.9 mg/cm^{3} and surface area of 47.3 m^{2}/g with flexible cellulose nanofibril and stiff graphene components. After optimizing the concentration of graphene oxide concentration and anisotropic porous structure, tensile tests were performed. It was found that MGCA could recover 99.8% and 96.3% when compressed to 60% and 90% strain, respectively. SEM images showed that due to its unique structure, MCGA pore walls were able to wrinkle and fold during compression. Another unique characteristic of this material is its absorption capacity of 80-197 times its weight towards hydrophobic compounds, such as oils and chemical solvents.

On the contrary, less effort has been made to study the stretchability of porous carbons. Gao, et al. synthesized a long-range lamellar scaffold composed of chitosan and graphene oxide via bidirectional freezing, freeze drying, and annealing. The result is a material with density of 11 mg cm^{−3} and porosity of about 99.4%. Various tensile tests were conducted, and it was found that carbon spring could revert to its original shape upon 80% compression strain and -60% stretching strain with a Poisson's ratio between 0.05 and 0.1. The narrow hysteresis loop of the stress-strain curve indicates a low energy dissipation (energy loss coefficient of about 0.2) because of its negligible interior friction, localized buckling, or cracks during deformation processes. The stretchable mechanical properties of this material allow for great candidates for vibrational and magnetism sensors.
