= Coupling coefficient =

Coupling coefficient, or coupling factor, may refer to:

- Electromechanical coupling coefficient
- Coupling coefficient (inductors), or coupling factor, between inductances
- Coupling coefficient of resonators
- Coupling factor of power dividers and directional couplers
- Clebsch–Gordan coefficients of angular momentum coupling in quantum mechanics

== See also ==
- Leakage inductance
