= Hysteresivity =

Type of lag in a mechanical system

Hysteresivity derives from "hysteresis", meaning "lag". It is the tendency to react slowly to an outside force, or to not return completely to its original state. Whereas the area within a hysteresis loop represents energy dissipated to heat and is an extensive quantity with units of energy, the hysteresivity represents the fraction of the elastic energy that is lost to heat, and is an intensive property that is dimensionless.

== Overview ==
When a force deforms a material it generates elastic stresses and internal frictional stresses. Most often, frictional stress is described as being analogous to the stress that results from the flow of a viscous fluid, but in many engineering materials, in soft biological tissues, and in living cells, the concept that friction arises only from a viscous stress is now known to be erroneous. For example, Bayliss and Robertson and Hildebrandt demonstrated that frictional stress in lung tissue is dependent upon the amount of lung expansion but not the rate of expansion, findings that are fundamentally incompatible with the notion of friction being caused by a viscous stress. If not by a viscous stress, how then does friction arise, and how is it properly described?

In many inert and living materials, the relationship between elastic and frictional stresses turns out to be very nearly invariant (something unaltered by a transformation). In lung tissues, for example, the frictional stress is almost invariably between 0.1 and 0.2 of the elastic stress, where this fraction is called the hysteresivity, h, or, equivalently, the structural damping coefficient. It is a simple phenomenological fact, therefore, that for each unit of peak elastic strain energy that is stored during a cyclic deformation, 10 to 20% of that elastic energy is taxed as friction and lost irreversibly to heat. This fixed relationship holds at the level of the whole lung , isolated lung parenchymal tissue strips, isolated smooth muscle strips, and even isolated living cells.

This close relationship between frictional and elastic stresses is called the structural damping law or, sometimes, the constant phase model. The structural damping law implies that frictional losses are coupled tightly to elastic stresses rather than to viscous stresses, but the precise molecular mechanical origin of this phenomenon remains unknown. In material science, the complex elastic modulus of a material, G*(f), at frequency of oscillatory deformation f, is given by,

$$G^{*}(f)=G'+jG''$$

where:

- G*(f)= complex elastic modulus at frequency of oscillatory deformation, f
- G′ = the elastic modulus
- G′′ = the loss modulus
- j ^{2} = −1

This relationship can be rewritten as,

$$\ G^{*}(f)=G'(1 + jh)$$

where:

- h = G′′/G′.

In systems conforming to the structural damping law, the hysteresivity h is constant with or insensitive to changes in oscillatory frequency, and the loss modulus G′′ (= hG′) becomes a constant fraction of the elastic modulus.

== See also ==
- Dynamic modulus
- Shear stress
- Viscosity
