= Isaak D. Mayergoyz =

Soviet-American physicist

Isaak D. Mayergoyz is the Alford L. Ward Professor of the Department of Electrical and Computer Engineering at the University of Maryland, College Park.

He received his master and PhD degrees in the former Soviet Union, where he was a senior research scientist at the Institute of Cybernetics of the Ukrainian Academy of Sciences before immigrating to the US in 1980. In the next year, he was appointed full professor of the Electrical Engineering Department at the University of Maryland. In 1987, he received the Outstanding Teacher Award of the university's College of Engineering. In 1988, he was selected as a visiting research fellow of the Research and Development Center of General Electric after having consulted for the same center and having participated in the development of MRI systems. In the same year (1988), he became a Fellow of IEEE. In 1994, he became a distinguished lecturer of the IEEE Magnetics Society as well as a distinguished scholar-teacher of the University of Maryland, College Park. He received the Achievement Award, the highest award of the IEEE Magnetics Society, in 2010. In 2018 he was named a Distinguished University Professor at the University of Maryland.

His areas of research have included plasmon resonances in nanoparticles, nonlinear magnetization dynamics induced by spin polarized currents, fluctuations in nanoscale semiconductor devices, mathematical modeling of hysteresis and stochastic analysis of systems with hysteresis, drive independent recovery and forensics of hard disk data, computational electromagnetics, power engineering’ and hysteresis in economics.

== Books ==
- "Analysis of three-dimensional electromagnetic fields", (with O. Tozoni), Kiev, Tehnika, 1974, pp. 1–352.
- "Iterative methods for the calculation of static fields in inhomogeneous anisotropic nonlinear media", Kiev, Naukova Dumka, Ukrainian Academy of Sciences, 1979, pp. 1–210.
- "Mathematical Models of Hysteresis", (I. D. Mayergoyz), Springer-Verlag, 1991, pp. 1–232.
- "Méthods numériques en électromagnétisme", (A. Bossavit, C. Emson, I. D. Mayergoyz), publisher "Collection de la Direction des Études et Recherches d’Électricité de France," 1991.
- "Basic Electric Circuit Theory", (I. D. Mayergoyz, W. Lawson), Academic Press, 1996, pp. 1–439.
- "Basic Electric Circuit Theory", (I. D. Mayergoyz, W. Lawson), Italian Translation, Publisher UTET, 2000, pp. 1–493.
- "Nonlinear Diffusion of Electromagnetic Fields (with Applications to Eddy Currents and Superconductivity)", (I. Mayergoyz), Academic Press, 1998, pp. 1–412.
- "Mathematical Models of Hysteresis and Their Applications", (I. D. Mayergoyz), Academic Press-Elsevier, 2003, pp. 1–475.
- "The Science of Hysteresis", (Three-volume treatise) (Editors G. Bertotti and I. Mayergoyz), Academic Press-Elsevier, 2006, pp. 1–2019.
- Analysis of Fluctuations in Nanoscale Semiconductor Devices, Chapter 6 in vol. 5 of "Handbook of Semiconductor Nanostructures and Nanodevices" (I. D. Mayergoyz and P. Andrei), American Scientific Publishers, 2006, pp. 257–324.
- "Spin-Stand Microscopy of Hard Disk Data", (I. D. Mayergoyz, C. Tse), Elsevier, 2007, pp. 1–225.
- "Nonlinear Magnetization Dynamics in Nanosystems", (G. Bertotti, I. Mayergoyz, C. Serpico), Elsevier, 2009, pp. 1–466.
- "Plasmon Resonances in Nanoparticles", (I. D. Mayergoyz), World Scientific, 2013, pp. 1–325.
- "Fundamentals of Electric Power Engineering", (I. D. Mayergoyz, P. McAvoy), World Scientific, 2015, pp. 1–522.
- "Quantum Mechanics for Electrical Engineers", (I. Mayergoyz), World Scientific, 2016, pp. 1–312.
- "Hysteresis and Neural Memory", (I. Mayergoyz, C. Korman), World Scientific, 2020, pp. 1-278.
- ”Pulse Width Modulation in Power Electronics”, (I. Mayergoyz, S. Tyagi), World Scientific, 2021, pp. 1-402.
- “Theory of Macroeconomic Hysteresis”, (I.Mayergoyz, C . E. Korman), World Scientific, 2024, pp.1-200.
