= Electrochemical flow capacitor =

An electrochemical flow capacitor (EFC), or simply flow capacitor, is an electrochemical energy storage device that combines characteristics of supercapacitors and redox flow batteries (RFBs).

Unlike conventional capacitors, which have fixed solid electrodes, electrochemical flow capacitors employ solid suspensions of active material dispersed in an electrolyte. These suspensions, known as flow electrodes, are stored in external reservoirs and pumped through the main electrochemical cell during charging and discharging operations. The use of external storage tanks allows the energy storage capacity of the system to be scaled by increasing the volume of the reservoirs, independently from the size and geometry of the electrochemical cell. This decoupling of energy and power capacity, a characteristic shared with redox flow batteries, has spiked interest in electrochemical flow capacitors as a potential device able to achieve higher energy densities than conventional supercapacitors while retaining their high power capability and long cycle life.

== Operating principles ==
Electric double layer (1) and diffusion layer (2). The image shows two negatively charged surfaces (in yellow) and cations (positive ions) adsorbed onto it in the EDL, shown in blue.

Electrochemical flow capacitors store energy primarily through electric double-layer charge storage mechanisms, although systems incorporating pseudocapacitive materials are gaining interest thanks to the possibility of increasing energy density.

Both mechanisms are based on charge storage at the surface of conductive particles suspended in an electrolyte, unlike redox flow batteries, where energy is stored directly in the electrolyte through the reversible redox reactions of electroactive species dissolved in it. In order to maximize charge storage capacity, flow electrodes are typically made of conductive materials with a high specific surface area, such as porous or layered materials.

During charging, the flow electrodes are pumped through a polarized electrochemical cell, in which the positive and negative compartments are separated by an ion-permeable membrane or separator. Once charged, the flow electrodes are returned to separate storage reservoirs, while for discharge, they are recirculated through the electrochemical cell, where the stored energy is released to an external electrical circuit. The charge transport and polarization of the suspended electrodes rely on electrical contacts between particles, so that the concentration of solids in the flow electrode must be sufficiently high to establish percolation pathways among them, resulting in highly concentrated and viscous slurries. Using spherical particles as electrodes can reduce viscosity through shear-thinning behavior. Even the geometry of the flow channels can improve the flowability of the electrodes, with larger and shallower channels that can improve current distribution while reducing mass transport issues.

More recent developments of electrochemical flow capacitors also employ asymmetric flow electrode configurations, in which the composition or concentration of the positive and negative flow electrodes differ, as a strategy to optimize capacitance, operating voltage, and overall device performance.

== History ==
The flow electrodes that were first used were made of a slurry of different loads of activated carbon particles. The choice of electrodes fell on activated carbon thanks to its wide availability, reduced cost, and known properties, since carbon slurries have been studied since the 80s. These early studies demonstrated that carbon slurries can be conductive and can act as an electrochemically active material while maintaining the ability to flow through an electrochemical reactor.

Later renditions of the flow capacitor also included asymmetric flow capacitors, which employ two different types of electrodes at the anode and cathode.

The electrochemical flow capacitor as a distinct energy storage concept was introduced in 2012 by Presser, Dennison and Gogotsi from Drexel University, who proposed a device combining the capacitive charge storage mechanism of electric double-layer capacitors with the scalable architecture of redox flow batteries. In their design they used electrodes slurries made of carbon beads derived from phenolic resin and mixed with a carbon black additive to improve the conductivity of the slurry.

== Electrode materials ==
Porous carbons are the most widely investigated flow electrode materials due to their high surface area, cheapness, abundance and electrochemical stability. Activated carbon in particular has been the most commonly used material in electrochemical flow capacitors, as it was also employed in the first reported devices. Activated carbon in particular shows a high specific surface area, typically ranging from several hundreds to more than 2000 m² g⁻¹. Other carbon-based materials investigated for use in flow electrodes include carbon black, carbon nanotubes (CNTs), graphene, activated carbon fibers, and carbon aerogels. Carbon-based electrodes exhibit traditional capacitive behaviour, with the formation of an electric double layer that allows for fast charge and discharge rates.

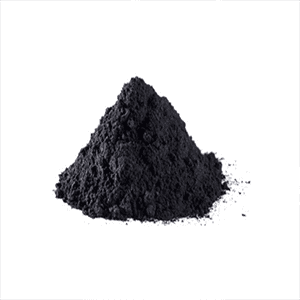
Activated carbon powder

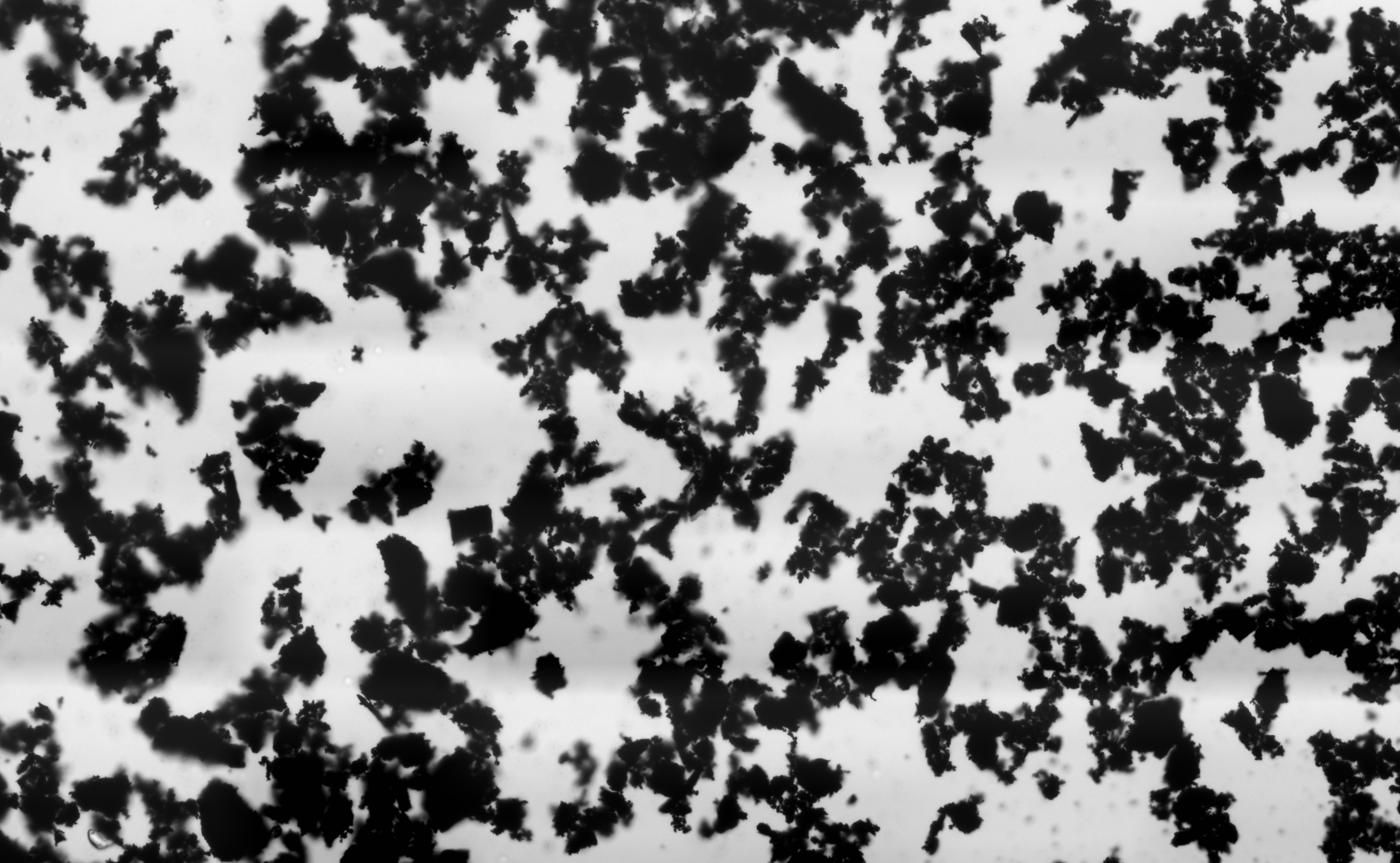
Close-up of activated carbon flakes that are around 100μm in size

In addition to electric double-layer materials, pseudocapacitive and faradaic materials have also been investigated to increase the energy density of electrochemical flow capacitors. These include transition metal oxides, such as manganese dioxide and ruthenium oxide, conductive polymers, transition metal carbides and nitrides, zeolites and two-dimensional materials such as MXenes. These materials present very high surface areas, which increase the sites available for charge adsorption through fast reversible surface redox reactions, that contribute to the increase in capacitance of the electrodes.

The electrolyte composition also plays an important role in determining the performance of electrochemical flow capacitors, with both aqueous and non-aqueous electrolytes that present advantages and drawbacks. Aqueous electrolytes contain dissolved ionic salt in varying concentrations that generally provide high ionic conductivity and have a low cost, but are limited by the electrochemical stability window of water, whereas non-aqueous organic electrolytes can support higher operating voltages, but at the expense of lower conductivity and higher costs.

== Applications ==
=== Stationary energy storage ===
Electrochemical flow capacitors have been considered for stationary energy storage applications due to their ability to decouple energy storage capacity from power output. The energy capacity of electrochemical flow capacitors can be increased simply by enlarging the volume of the external reservoirs without modifying the electrochemical cell architecture. Because electrochemical flow capacitors store energy primarily through capacitive mechanisms, they can exhibit high power density, rapid charging and discharging rates, in the range of seconds or milliseconds, and long cycle life thanks to the avoidance of chemical reactions. These characteristics have led to their investigation for applications requiring frequent charge-discharge cycling and rapid power delivery.

=== Water desalination ===
Flow electrodes developed for electrochemical flow capacitors have also been applied to electrochemical water treatment technologies, particularly flow-electrode capacitive deionization (FCDI). In FCDI systems, conductive flowable electrodes are continuously circulated through an electrochemical cell to remove dissolved ions from water through capacitive adsorption. Flow electrodes allow for continuous operation and electrodes reuse and can increase the salt removal capacity compared with conventional capacitive deionization systems employing fixed electrodes.

=== Electrochemical separations and resource recovery ===
The use of conductive flowable electrodes has also been investigated for electrochemical separation processes and resource recovery applications. These include the selective removal and recovery of dissolved ions, metals, and other chemical species from aqueous solutions. The ability to continuously regenerate the electrochemically active material through circulation has been proposed as an advantage for large-scale separation processes.
