= Rosemarie Wenner =

German Methodist bishop (born 1955)

- Presiding Bishop
- Church: United Methodist Church
- In office: April 2005 – May 2017
- Other post: President of the United Methodist Council of Bishops (2012–2014)

Personal details
- Born: 1 July 1955 (age 70) Eppingen, Heilbronn, Baden-Württemberg
- Denomination: Methodism

Rosemarie Wenner (born July 1, 1955) is a German Methodist bishop. She was the Presiding Bishop of the United Methodist Church in Germany from April 2005 until May 2017.

Rosemarie Wenner studied in Reutlingen, Germany. After her ordination she worked in Karlsruhe-Durlach, Hockenheim and Darmstadt/Sprendlingen.

On April 1, 2005 Rosemarie Wenner was the first woman to be elected United Methodist bishop in Germany. She succeeded Dr. Walter Klaiber.

From 2012 to 2014 she was the president of the UMC Council of Bishops. She was the first woman from outside the United States to preside over the council.

Rosemarie Wenner is a member of the UMC Commission on a Way Forward that was tasked by the General Conference find a solution for the conflict on the disputed paragraphs in the UMC's Book of Discipline regarding homosexuality.

== See also ==
- List of bishops of the United Methodist Church
