= Evangelical Free Church (disambiguation) =

Evangelical Free Church can refer to the Evangelical Free Church of America, an evangelical Protestant denomination based in the United States.

Evangelical Free Church may also refer to:

== Denominations ==
- Evangelical Free Church of Canada, an evangelical Protestant denomination based in Canada
- Evangelical Free Church of China, a Protestant denomination headquartered in Hong Kong
- Evangelical Free Church of Malaysia, an evangelical denomination headquartered in Malacca
- Japan Evangelical Free Church

== Other ==
- Evangelical Free Church (Southbridge, Massachusetts), a historic church in that town
