= Electromechanical coupling coefficient =

The electromechanical coupling coefficient is a numerical measure of the conversion efficiency between electrical and acoustic energy in piezoelectric materials.

Qualitatively the electromechanical coupling coefficient, k, can be described as:

$$k^{-2} = \frac{1}{\mbox{ energy converted per input energy}}$$
