= Holy Trinity Episcopal Church (Southbridge, Massachusetts) =

Historic church in Massachusetts, United States

- Evangelical Free Church
- U.S. National Register of Historic Places
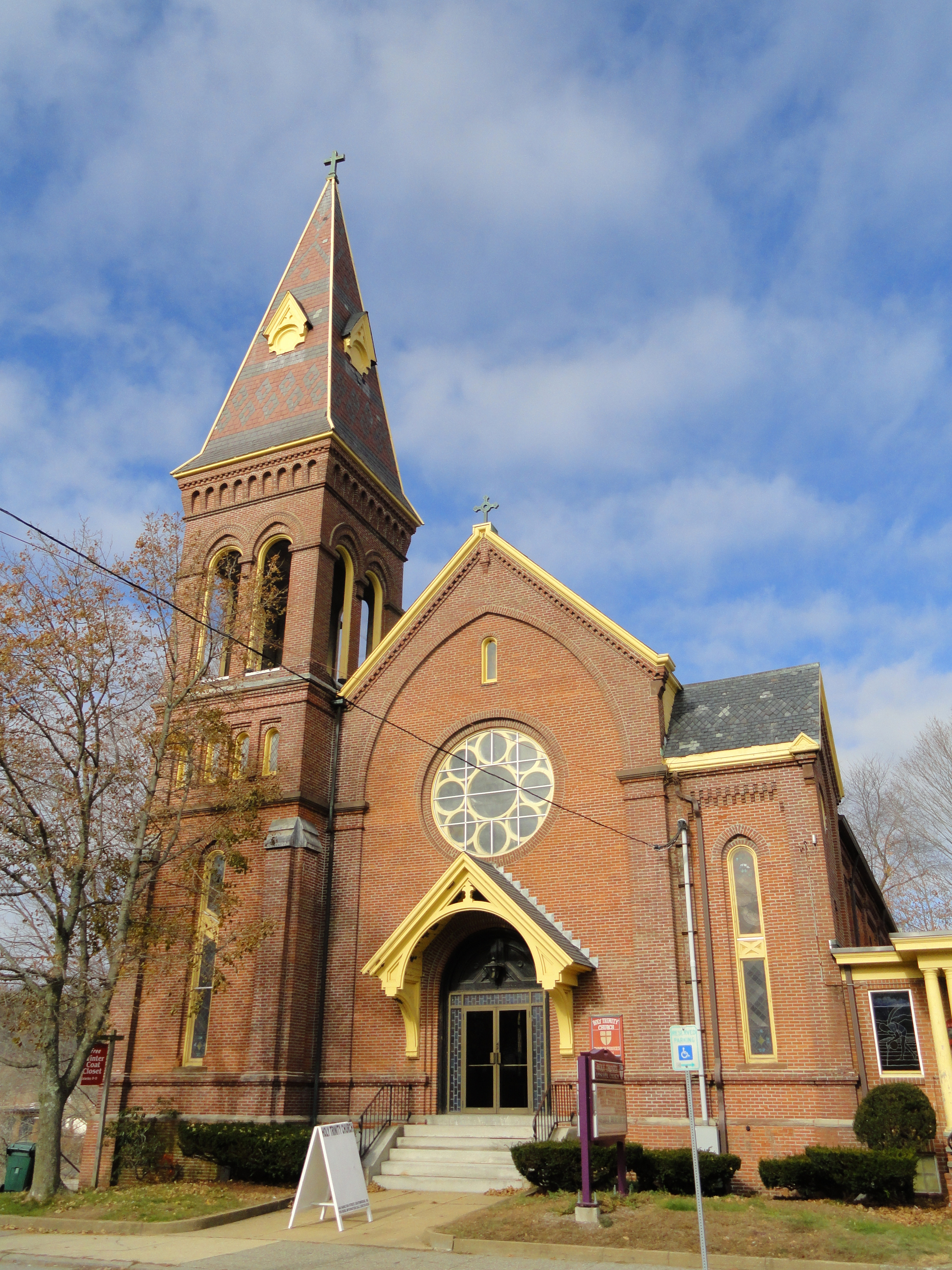

- Location within Massachusetts Location within the United States
- Location: 446 Hamilton St., Southbridge, Massachusetts
- Coordinates: 42°4′55″N 72°2′29″W
- Built: 1869
- Architectural style: Gothic, Romanesque
- MPS: Southbridge MRA
- NRHP reference No.: 89000561
- Added to NRHP: June 22, 1989

The Holy Trinity Episcopal Church, formerly the Evangelical Free Church, is a historic church building at 446 Hamilton Street in Southbridge, Massachusetts. Built in 1869 for a nominally non-denominational congregation of senior Hamilton Woolen Company employees, it has house an Episcopal congregation since 1921. The building is architecturally noted for its Romanesque and Gothic Revival features, and was listed on the National Register of Historic Places in 1989.

== Description and history ==
The church is located on the north side of Hamilton Street, east of (and across the Quinebaug River from) the former Hamilton Woolen Company mill complex. It is a roughly rectangular brick building, with a steeply pitched front-facing gable roof. A tower rises at the southwest corner, its open belfry framed by paired round-arch openings and topped by a pyramidal roof with a flared edge. The building features are mainly Romanesque, with round-arch windows, paneled nave walls, and corbelled eaves. However, it also has Victorian Gothic touches, including its front entry porch and polychromatic slate roof.

The church was built in 1869 by the Hamilton Woolen Company for a nominally non-denominational congregation of its senior employees and owners. The congregation was in practice Congregationalist, and was sometimes referred to derisively as the "Church of the Holy Supervisors". In 1921, with its enrollment declining, the company sold the building to the Holy Trinity Episcopalian congregation, which had been accumulating a building fund since 1909. It was severely damaged by fires in 1930 and 1940, but rebuilt after each one. The parish hall, which extends to the right of the main building, was added in 1958.

== See also ==
- National Register of Historic Places listings in Southbridge, Massachusetts
- National Register of Historic Places listings in Worcester County, Massachusetts
