= Jiles–Atherton model =

Model of magnetic hysteresis

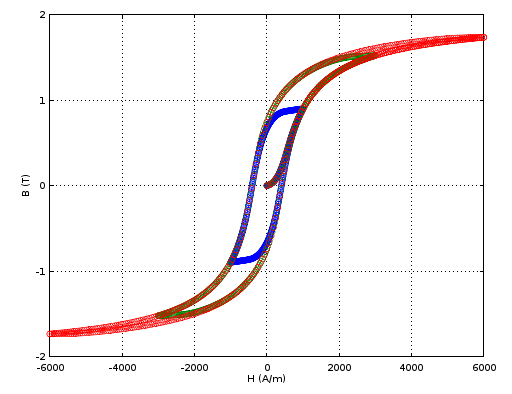
Results of modelling of magnetic hysteresis loops of isotropic magnetic material, Mn-Zn ferrite. Calculation performed with OCTAVE using JAmodel library.

In electromagnetism and materials science, the Jiles–Atherton model of magnetic hysteresis was introduced in 1984 by David Jiles and D. L. Atherton. This is one of the most popular models of magnetic hysteresis. Its main advantage is the fact that this model enables connection with physical parameters of the magnetic material. Jiles–Atherton model enables calculation of minor and major hysteresis loops. The original Jiles–Atherton model is suitable only for isotropic materials. However, an extension of this model presented by Ramesh et al. and corrected by Szewczyk enables the modeling of anisotropic magnetic materials.

== Principles ==
Magnetization $M$ of the magnetic material sample in Jiles–Atherton model is calculated in the following steps for each value of the magnetizing field $H$:

- effective magnetic field $H_\text{e}$ is calculated considering interdomain coupling $\alpha$ and magnetization $M$,
- anhysteretic magnetization $M_\text{an}$ is calculated for effective magnetic field $H_\text{e}$,
- magnetization $M$ of the sample is calculated by solving ordinary differential equation taking into account sign of derivative of magnetizing field $H$ (which is the source of hysteresis).

== Parameters ==
Original Jiles–Atherton model considers following parameters:

Parameter	Units	Description
$\alpha$		Quantifies interdomain coupling in the magnetic material
$a$	A/m	Quantifies domain walls density in the magnetic material
$M_\text{s}$	A/m	Saturation magnetization of material
$k$	A/m	Quantifies average energy required to break pinning site in the magnetic material
$c$		Magnetization reversibility

Extension considering uniaxial anisotropy introduced by Ramesh et al. and corrected by Szewczyk requires additional parameters:

Parameter	Units	Description
$K_\text{an}$	J/m^{3}	Average anisotropy energy density
$\psi$	rad	Angle between direction of magnetizing field $H$ and direction of anisotropy easy axis
$t$		Participation of anisotropic phase in the magnetic material

== Modelling the magnetic hysteresis loops ==
=== Effective magnetic field ===
Effective magnetic field $H_\text{e}$ influencing on magnetic moments within the material may be calculated from the following equation:

$$H_\text{e} = H + \alpha M$$

This effective magnetic field is analogous to the Weiss mean field acting on magnetic moments within a magnetic domain.

=== Anhysteretic magnetization ===
Anhysteretic magnetization can be observed experimentally, when magnetic material is demagnetized under the influence of constant magnetic field. However, measurements of anhysteretic magnetization are very sophisticated due to the fact, that the fluxmeter has to keep accuracy of integration during the demagnetization process. As a result, experimental verification of the model of anhysteretic magnetization is possible only for materials with negligible hysteresis loop.
Anhysteretic magnetization of typical magnetic material can be calculated as a weighted sum of isotropic and anisotropic anhysteretic magnetization:

$$M_\text{an} = (1 - t) M_\text{an}^\text{iso} + t M_\text{an}^\text{aniso}$$

==== Isotropic ====
Isotropic anhysteretic magnetization $M_\text{an}^\text{iso}$ is determined on the base of Boltzmann distribution. In the case of isotropic magnetic materials, Boltzmann distribution can be reduced to Langevin function connecting isotropic anhysteretic magnetization with effective magnetic field $H_\text{e}$:

$$M_\text{an}^\text{iso} = M_\text{s}\left(\coth\left(\frac{H_\text{e}}{a}\right) - \frac{a}{H_\text{e}}\right)$$

==== Anisotropic ====
Anisotropic anhysteretic magnetization $M_\text{an}^\text{aniso}$ is also determined on the base of Boltzmann distribution. However, in such a case, there is no antiderivative for the Boltzmann distribution function. For this reason, integration has to be made numerically. In the original publication, anisotropic anhysteretic magnetization $M_\text{an}^\text{aniso}$ is given as:

$$M_\text{an}^\text{aniso} = M_\text{s}\frac{\displaystyle\int_0^\pi \! e^{E(1) + E(2)}\sin\theta\cos\theta\,d\theta}{\displaystyle\int_0^\pi \! e^{E(1) + E(2)}\sin\theta\,d\theta}$$

where
$$\begin{align}
E(1) &= \frac{H_\text{e}}{a}\cos\theta-\frac{K_\text{an}}{M_\text{s} \mu_0 a} \sin^2(\psi-\theta) \\[4pt]
E(2) &= \frac{H_\text{e}}{a}\cos\theta-\frac{K_\text{an}}{M_\text{s} \mu_0 a} \sin^2(\psi+\theta)
\end{align}$$

It should be highlighted, that a typing mistake occurred in the original Ramesh et al. publication. As a result, for an isotropic material (where $K_\text{an}=0)$), the presented form of anisotropic anhysteretic magnetization $M_\text{an}^\text{aniso}$ is not consistent with the isotropic anhysteretic magnetization $M_\text{an}^\text{iso}$ given by the Langevin equation. Physical analysis leads to the conclusion that the equation for anisotropic anhysteretic magnetization $M_\text{an}^\text{aniso}$ has to be corrected to the following form:

$$M_\text{an}^\text{aniso} = M_\text{s}\frac{\displaystyle \int_0^\pi \! e^\frac{E(1) + E(2)}{2} \sin\theta \cos\theta \, d\theta}{\displaystyle \int_0^\pi \! e^\frac{E(1) + E(2)}{2} \sin\theta \, d\theta}$$

In the corrected form, the model for anisotropic anhysteretic magnetization $M_\text{an}^\text{aniso}$ was confirmed experimentally for anisotropic amorphous alloys.

=== Magnetization as a function of magnetizing field ===
In Jiles–Atherton model, M(H) dependence is given in form of following ordinary differential equation:

$$\frac{dM}{dH} = \frac{1}{1 + c}\frac{M_\text{an} - M}{\delta k - \alpha(M_\text{an} - M)} + \frac{c}{1 + c}\frac{dM_\text{an}}{dH}$$

where $\delta$ depends on direction of changes of magnetizing field $H$ ($\delta = 1$ for increasing field, $\delta = -1$ for decreasing field)

=== Flux density as a function of magnetizing field ===
Flux density $B$ in the material is given as:

$$B(H) = \mu_0 (H + M(H))$$

where $\mu_0$ is magnetic constant.

== Vectorized Jiles–Atherton model ==
Vectorized Jiles–Atherton model is constructed as the superposition of three scalar models one for each principal axis. This model is especially suitable for finite element method computations.

== Numerical implementation ==
The Jiles–Atherton model is implemented in JAmodel, a MATLAB/OCTAVE toolbox. It uses the Runge-Kutta algorithm for solving ordinary differential equations. JAmodel is open-source is under MIT license.

The two most important computational problems connected with the Jiles–Atherton model were identified:

- numerical integration of the anisotropic anhysteretic magnetization $M_\text{an}^\text{aniso}$
- solving the ordinary differential equation for $M(H)$ dependence.

For numerical integration of the anisotropic anhysteretic magnetization $M_\text{an}^\text{aniso}$ the Gauss–Kronrod quadrature formula has to be used. In GNU Octave this quadrature is implemented as quadgk() function.

For solving ordinary differential equation for $M(H)$ dependence, the Runge–Kutta methods are recommended. It was observed, that the best performing was 4-th order fixed step method.

== Further development ==
Since its introduction in 1984, Jiles–Atherton model was intensively developed. As a result, this model may be applied for the modeling of:

- frequency dependence of magnetic hysteresis loop in conductive materials
- influence of stresses on magnetic hysteresis loops
- magnetostriction of soft magnetic materials

Moreover, different corrections were implemented, especially:

- to avoid unphysical states when reversible permeability is negative
- to consider changes of average energy required to break pinning site

== Applications ==
Jiles–Atherton model may be applied for modeling:

- rotating electric machines
- power transformers
- magnetostrictive actuators
- magnetoelastic sensors
- magnetic field sensors (e. g. fluxgates)

It is also widely used for electronic circuit simulation, especially for models of inductive components, such as transformers or chokes.

== See also ==
- Preisach model of hysteresis
- Stoner–Wohlfarth model
