= Preisach model of hysteresis =

Model of magnetic hysteresis

In electromagnetism, the Preisach model of hysteresis is a model of magnetic hysteresis. Originally, it generalized hysteresis as the relationship between the magnetic field and magnetization of a magnetic material as the parallel connection of independent relay hysterons. It was first suggested in 1935 by Ferenc (Franz) Preisach in the German academic journal Zeitschrift für Physik. In the field of ferromagnetism, the Preisach model is sometimes thought to describe a ferromagnetic material as a network of small independently acting domains, each magnetized to a value of either $h$ or $-h$. A sample of iron, for example, may have evenly distributed magnetic domains, resulting in a net magnetic moment of zero.

Mathematically similar models seem to have been independently developed in other fields of science and engineering. One notable example is the model of capillary hysteresis in porous materials developed by Everett and co-workers. Since then, following the work of people like M. Krasnoselkii, A. Pokrovskii, A. Visintin, and I.D. Mayergoyz, the model has become widely accepted as a general mathematical tool for the description of hysteresis phenomena of different kinds.

== Nonideal relay ==
The relay hysteron is the fundamental building block of the Preisach model. It is described as a two-valued operator denoted by $R_{\alpha,\beta}$. Its I/O map takes the form of a loop, as shown:

Above, a relay of magnitude 1, $\alpha$ defines the "switch-off" threshold, and $\beta$ defines the "switch-on" threshold.

Graphically, if $x$ is less than $\alpha$, the output $y$ is "low" or "off." As we increase $x$, the output remains low until $x$ reaches $\beta$—at which point the output switches "on." Further increasing $x$ has no change. Decreasing $x$, $y$ does not go low until $x$ reaches $\alpha$ again. It is apparent that the relay operator $R_{\alpha,\beta}$ takes the path of a loop, and its next state depends on its past state.

Mathematically, the output of $R_{\alpha,\beta}$ is expressed as:

$$y(x)=\begin{cases}
1&\mbox{ if }x\geq\beta\\
0&\mbox{ if }x\leq\alpha \\
k&\mbox{ if }\alpha<x<\beta
\end{cases}$$

Where $k=0$ if the last time $x$ was outside of the boundaries $\alpha<x<\beta$, it was in the region of $x\leq\alpha$; and $k=1$ if the last time $x$ was outside of the boundaries $\alpha<x<\beta$, it was in the region of $x\geq\beta$.

This definition of the hysteron shows that the current value $y$ of the complete hysteresis loop depends upon the history of the input variable $x$.

== Discrete Preisach model ==
The Preisach model consists of many relay hysterons connected in parallel, given weights, and summed. This can be visualized by a block diagram:

Each of these relays has different $\alpha$ and $\beta$ thresholds and is scaled by $\mu$. With increasing $N$, the true hysteresis curve is approximated better.

An example of hysteresis modeled with different numbers, N, of hysterons.

In the limit as $N$ approaches infinity, we obtain the continuous Preisach model.

$$y(t)=\iint_{\alpha \geq \beta}\mu(\alpha,\beta)R_{\alpha\beta}x(t) d \alpha d \beta$$

== Preisach plane ==
One of the easiest ways to look at the Preisach model is using a geometric interpretation. Consider a plane of coordinates $(\alpha,\beta)$. On this plane, each point $(\alpha_{i},\beta_{i})$ is mapped to a specific relay hysteron $R_{\alpha_{i},\beta_{i}}$. Each relay can be plotted on this so-called Preisach plane with its $(\alpha,\beta)$ values. Depending on their distribution on the Preisach plane, the relay hysterons can represent hysteresis with good accuracy.

We consider only the half-plane $\alpha<\beta$ as any other case does not have a physical equivalent in nature.

Next, we take a specific point on the half plane and build a right triangle by drawing two lines parallel to the axes, both from the point to the line $\alpha=\beta$.

We now present the Preisach density function, denoted $\mu(\alpha,\beta)$. This function describes the amount of relay hysterons of each distinct values of $(\alpha_{i},\beta_{i})$. As a default we say that outside the right triangle $\mu(\alpha,\beta)=0$.

A modified formulation of the classical Preisach model has been presented, allowing analytical expression of the Everett function. This makes the model considerably faster and especially adequate for inclusion in electromagnetic field computation or electric circuit analysis codes.

== Vector Preisach model ==
The vector Preisach model is constructed as the linear superposition of scalar models. For considering the uniaxial anisotropy of the material, Everett functions are expanded by Fourier coefficients. In this case, the measured and simulated curves are in a very good agreement. Another approach uses different relay hysteron, closed surfaces defined on the 3D input space. In general spherical hysteron is used for vector hysteresis in 3D, and circular hysteron is used for vector hysteresis in 2D.

== Applications ==
The Preisach model has been applied to model hysteresis in a wide variety of fields, including to study irreversible changes in soil hydraulic conductivity as a result of saline and sodic conditions, the modeling of soil water retention and the effect of stress and strains on soil and rock structures.

== See also ==
- Jiles–Atherton model
- Stoner–Wohlfarth model
