= List of Missouri University of Science and Technology alumni =

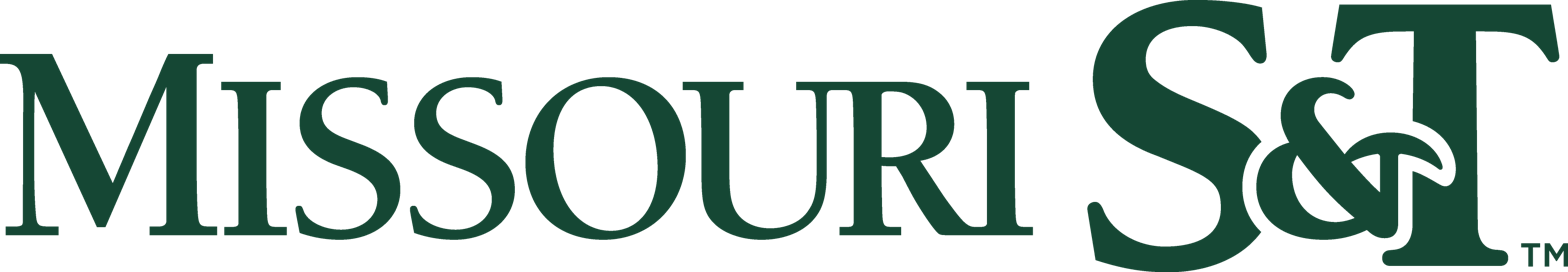
Missouri S&T logo

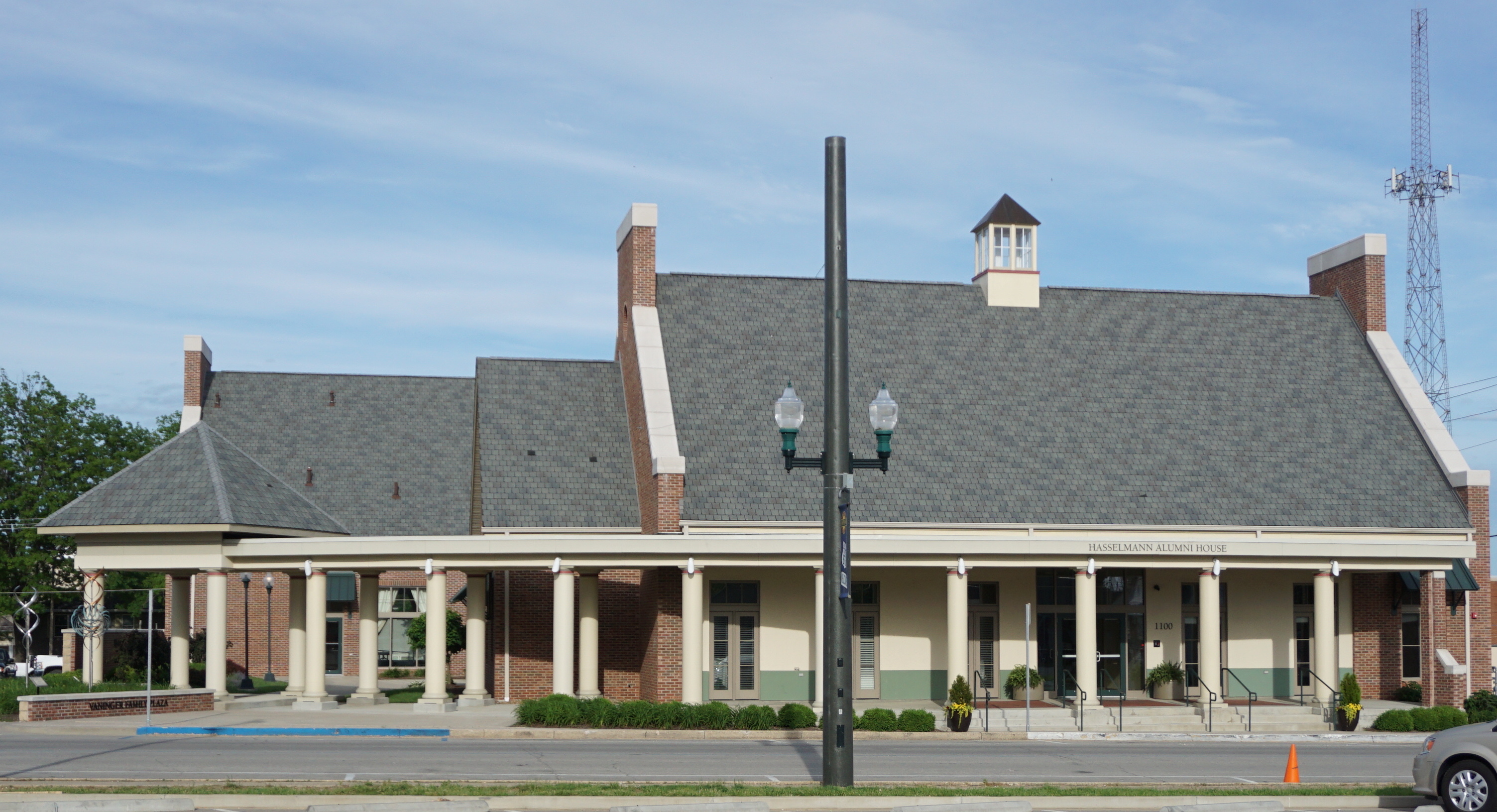
Hasselmann Alumni House at Missouri S&T

The alumni of Missouri University of Science and Technology, or Missouri S&T, include both graduates and non-graduates who have attended the university located in Rolla, Missouri. Missouri S&T was founded as the Missouri School of Mines and Metallurgy (MSM) in 1870, the first technological institution west of the Mississippi River. In 1964, the school's name was changed to University of Missouri–Rolla (UMR) as part of the University of Missouri System, and the most recent name change to Missouri University of Science and Technology took effect in 2008 to "distinguish UMR from the other University of Missouri campuses", among other reasons.

As of fall 2020, Missouri S&T had a total enrollment of 7,645 students (6,086 undergraduates and 1,559 graduate students). The Miner Alumni Association of Missouri S&T serves over 65,000 graduates and former students.

The Hasselmann Alumni House was dedicated in 2015 as the home for the Miner Alumni Association and as a venue for campus and community events. It is named for Karl Hasselmann, a 1925 graduate in mining engineering, who had a prominent career in the oil industry. The Havener Center, the multipurpose campus center for student life and activity, is named for entrepreneur Gary Havener, a 1962 graduate in mathematics.

The listed alumni span multiple fields and careers, particularly those concentrated in science, technology, engineering, and mathematics. The creator of Twitter, Jack Dorsey, enrolled at Missouri S&T in 1995 majoring in computer science and mathematics, but transferred out during his junior year to accept a job with the New York-based company Dispatch Management Services after hacking into their computer network and alerting the company chairman of a hole in their software. Many notable NASA astronauts and engineers are graduates from Missouri S&T, such as Sandra Magnus, who was aboard the last American Space Shuttle, and George Mueller, who helped enable the Apollo 11 Moon landing. Other S&T alumni have filled leadership positions within state and federal government, and some have become known in athletics and entertainment.

== Business ==
| Name | Class year | Notability | References |
|---|---|---|---|
| Jack Dorsey | Transferred out, 1997; did not graduate | Billionaire co-founder and CEO of Twitter (2006–2008, 2015–2021), and co-founder, chairman, and CEO of Square, Inc. (2009–present) | |
| Gary D. Forsee | 1972 (B.S.) | CEO of Sprint (2003–2007), president of the University of Missouri System (2008–2011) | |
| Thomas Holmes | 1950 (B.S.) | CEO of Ingersoll Rand (1980–1988) | |
| Dan Obrycki | 1983 (B.S.) | Co-founder of The Applied Finance Group | |
| Michael M. Sears | 1976 (M.S.) | Successfully launched the Boeing F/A-18E/F Super Hornet program, CFO of Boeing (2002–2003), terminated in 2003 as a result of corruption allegations and sentenced to four months in prison | |
| Ellis Short | 1983 (B.S.) | Founder of Kildare Partners private equity fund (2013), owner of Skibo Castle (2003–present) and Sunderland A.F.C. (2009–2018) | |
| Gary White | 1985 (B.S.), 1987 (M.S.) | Co-founder and CEO of Water.org, founding member of the Global Water Challenge, named on the 2011 TIME 100 list of the most influential people in the world | |
| Oz Yilmaz | 1970 (B.S.) | Chief technology officer of GeoTomo LLC (2002–present), elected as an international member to the National Academy of Engineering (2022) | |

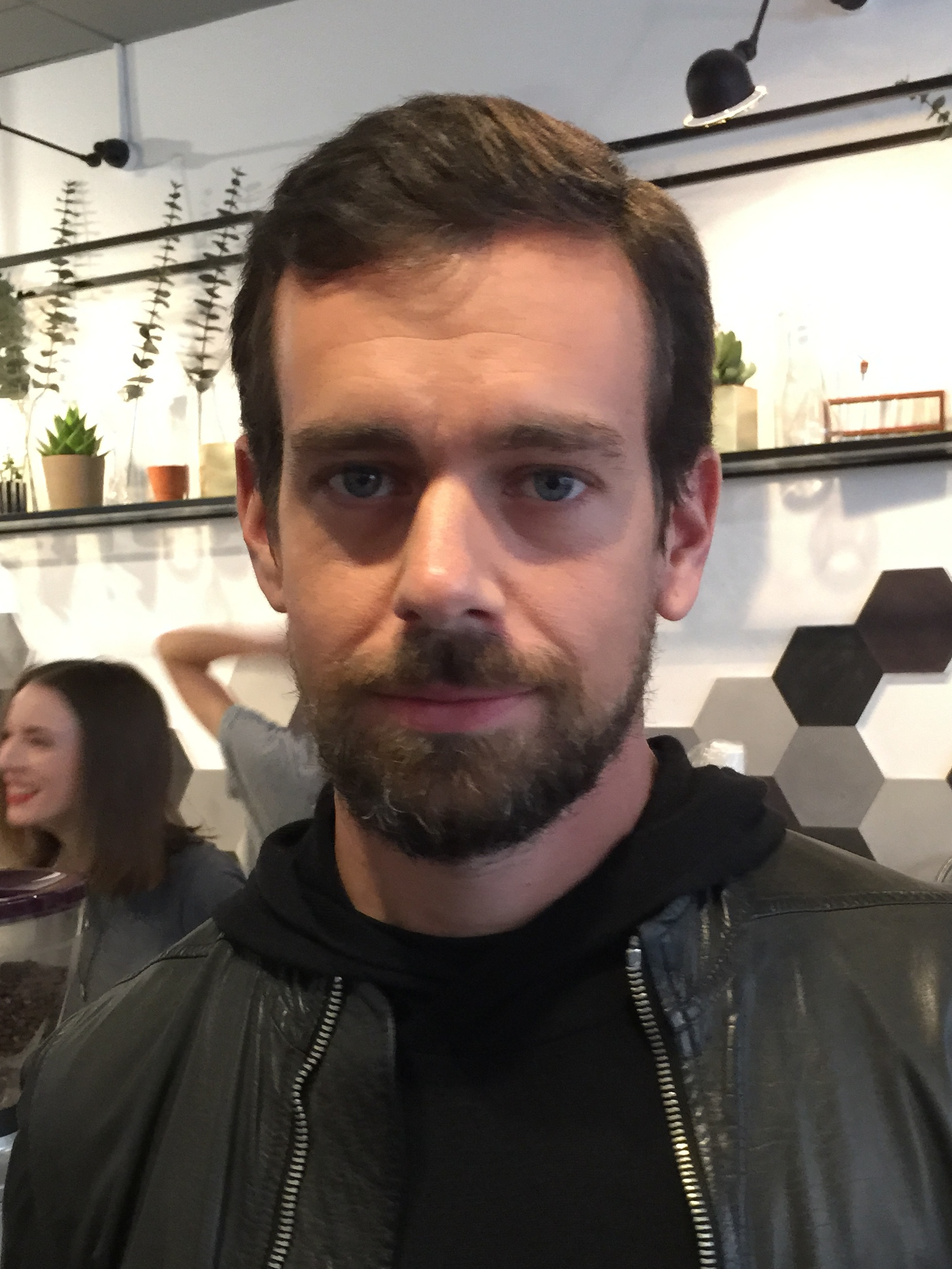
Jack Dorsey

== Education ==
| Name | Class year | Notability | References |
|---|---|---|---|
| Michel Barsoum | 1980 (M.S.) | Professor of materials science at Drexel University (1985–present), known for work with MAX phases | |
| Randall Berry | 1993 (B.S.) | Department chair (2019–present) and professor (2011–present) of electrical and computer engineering at Northwestern University | |
| Mack A. Breazeale | 1954 (M.S.) | Professor and senior scientist at the National Center for Physical Acoustics at the University of Mississippi (1995–2009), professor of physics at the University of Tennessee (1962–1995) and at Michigan State University (1957–1962), known for work in ultrasonics and physical acoustics | |
| Delbert Day | 1958 (B.S.) | Curator's Professor Emeritus of Ceramic Engineering at Missouri S&T, co-invented glass microspheres for medical (radiation therapy) and dental applications, and co-invented Glasphalt, which recycles waste glass for use in asphalt paving | |
| Servet A. Duran | 1943 (B.S.) | Professor (1947–1986) and department chairman (1959–1970) of metallurgy at Washington State University | |
| Bruce L. Edwards | 1977 (B.A.) | Professor of English and Africana studies at Bowling Green State University (1981–2012), general editor of the four-volume reference set C. S. Lewis: Life, Works, and Legacy | |
| Paul M. Feehan | 1984 (M.S.) | Erasmus Smith's Professor of Mathematics at Trinity College Dublin (2000–2001), professor of mathematics at Rutgers University (2001–present) | |
| Harold Garner | 1976 (B.S.) | Executive director of the Biocomplexity Institute of Virginia Tech (2009–2012), known for research in plasma physics, biological engineering, and bioinformatics | |
| Roger Garrison | 1967 (B.S.) | Professor of economics at Auburn University (1981–present), adjunct scholar of the Mises Institute | |
| William Giannobile | 1987 (B.S.) | Dean of the Harvard School of Dental Medicine (2020–present), professor of dentistry and biomedical engineering at University of Michigan (1998–2020) | |
| Gene Haertling | 1954 (B.S.) | Professor of ceramic engineering at Clemson University (1988–2000), developed and manufactured new lead zirconate titanate materials used in consumer electronics | |
| M. Frederick Hawthorne | Transferred out, 1940s | Curators' Distinguished Professor of chemistry and radiology at University of Missouri and director of its International Institute of Nano and Molecular Medicine (2008–present); a 2011 National Medal of Science recipient for his significant work involving boron | |
| John Johnson | 1999 (B.S.) | Professor of astronomy at Harvard University (2013–present), known for exoplanet research | |
| John Kieffer | 1967 (B.S.) | Professor of mathematics (1970–1986) at University of Missouri–Rolla, professor of electrical and computer engineering at University of Minnesota (1986–2011), known for work in information theory | |
| Kim Young-gil | 1969 (M.S.) | President of Handong Global University (1995–2014) | |
| David F. Larcker | 1972 (B.S.), 1974 (M.S.) | Professor at Stanford University in the Stanford Graduate School of Business (2005–present) | |
| Glenn Lipscomb | 1981 (B.S.) | Department chair of chemical engineering at the University of Toledo (2004–2019) | |
| Dana S. Nau | 1974 (B.S.) | Professor of computer science and systems research at the University of Maryland, College Park (1994–present), discovered game tree pathology and developed simple hierarchical ordered planner (SHOP) HTN planning systems | |
| Shrihari Sridhar | 2004 (M.S.) | Senior associate dean at the Mays Business School at Texas A&M University (2023–present), known for work on marketing strategy | |
| André Taylor | 1995 (B.S.) | Associate professor of chemical engineering at the New York University Tandon School of Engineering (2018–present), known for developing new materials for energy conversion | |
| Scott R. White | 1985 (B.S.) | Faculty and professor of aerospace engineering at the University of Illinois Urbana-Champaign (1990–2018), known for his innovations of self-healing materials | |

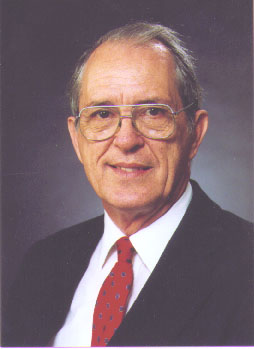
Mack A. Breazeale

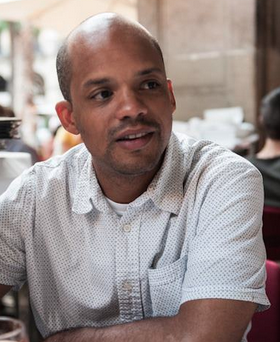
John Johnson

== Entertainment and athletics ==
| Name | Class year | Notability | References |
|---|---|---|---|
| Marv Breuer | 1935 (B.S.) | Major League Baseball pitcher for the New York Yankees (1939–1943) and a reliever in the 1941 and 1942 World Series | |
| Aaron Buerge | 1997 (B.S.) | Television personality known for starring in Season 2 of The Bachelor | |
| Charlie Copley | circa 1914 | NFL tackle and end for the Akron Pros (1920–1922) and Milwaukee Badgers (1922), head coach of the Gilberton Cadamounts (1923) | |
| David Elsenrath | 1985 (B.S.) | Head football coach for the Adams State Grizzlies (1997–1999) | |
| Forrestal Hickman | 2015 (B.S.) | Offensive lineman who has played in the NFL as a free agent for the San Diego Chargers (2015) and has played as a signed athlete in the CFL for the Montreal Alouettes (2016) and the IFL for the Colorado Crush (2017) and the Sioux Falls Storm (2018–2020) | |
| A. J. Mandani | 2010 | Professional Indonesian Basketball League player for CLS Knights Indonesia (2020–present), previously on the MPBL's Caloocan Katipuneros (2018–2019), TBL's TGE team (2018), ABL's Singapore Slingers (2017), and several PBA teams (2012–2016) | |
| Bill Preston | circa 1915 | NFL tackle for the Akron Pros (1920), 1920 NFL champion | |
| Greg "Fossilman" Raymer | 1985 (B.S.) | 2004 World Series of Poker Main Event champion | |
| Gonzalo Rodríguez Risco | 1993 (B.S.) | Peruvian playwright and screenwriter | |
| Brad Scott | Transferred out, 1976 | Head football coach for the University of South Carolina (1994–1998), assistant football coach for Clemson University (1999–2011) | |
| Tyrone Smith | 2006 (B.A.) | Long jumper representing Bermuda, 3-time Olympian, reached the finals in the 2012 Summer Olympics, champion in the 2010 Central American and Caribbean Games and the 2011 Central American and Caribbean Championships in Athletics | |
| Harry Stella | Transferred out, 1936 | Tackle for the Army Cadets football team at the United States Military Academy (1936–1939), 1939 First-team All-American, retired at the rank of colonel | |
| Dick Thornton | circa 1930 | Quarterback for the Philadelphia Eagles (1933) | |
| Tershawn Wharton | 2019 | Defensive tackle for the Kansas City Chiefs (2020–2024) and the Carolina Panthers (2025–present) | |

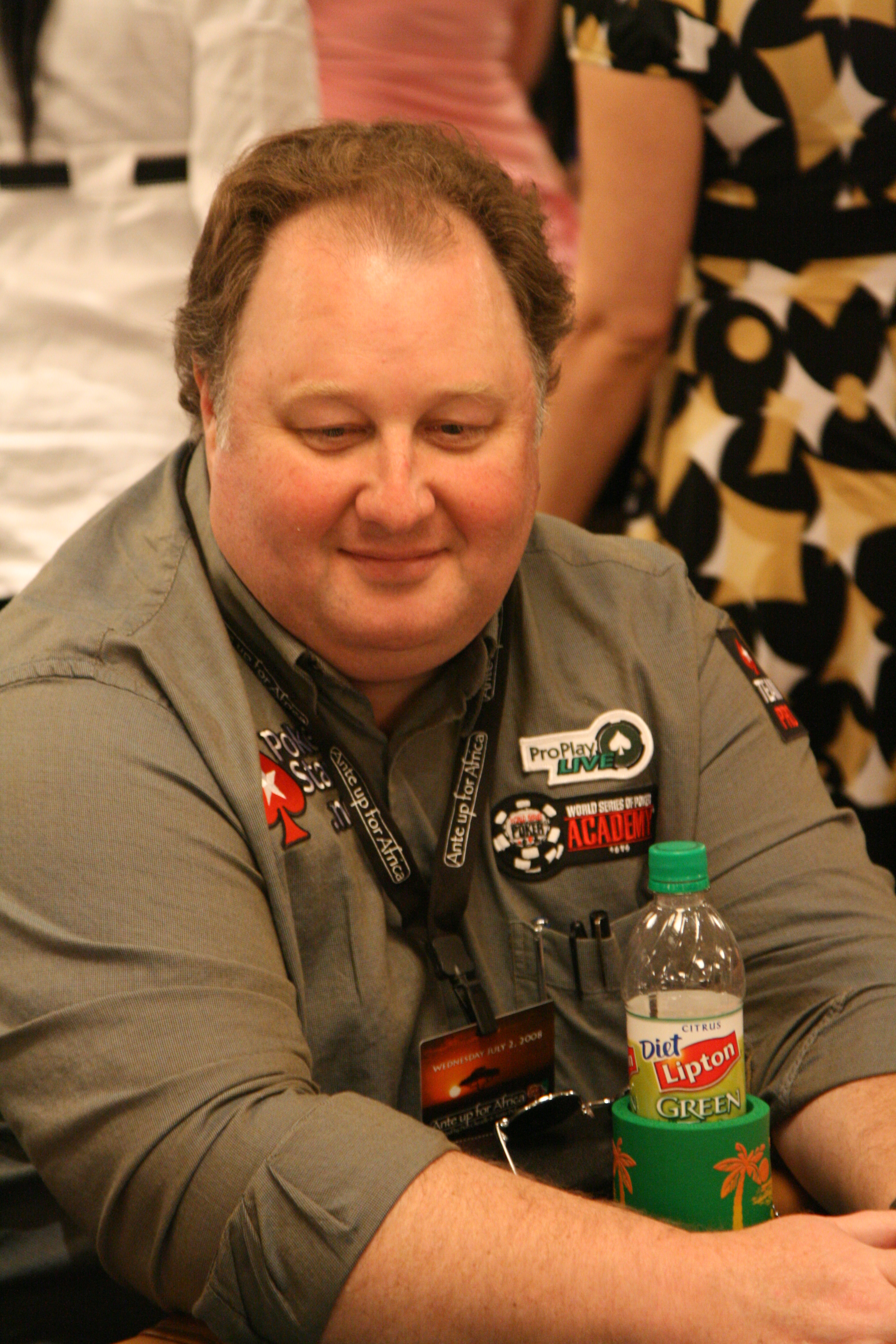
Greg "Fossilman" Raymer

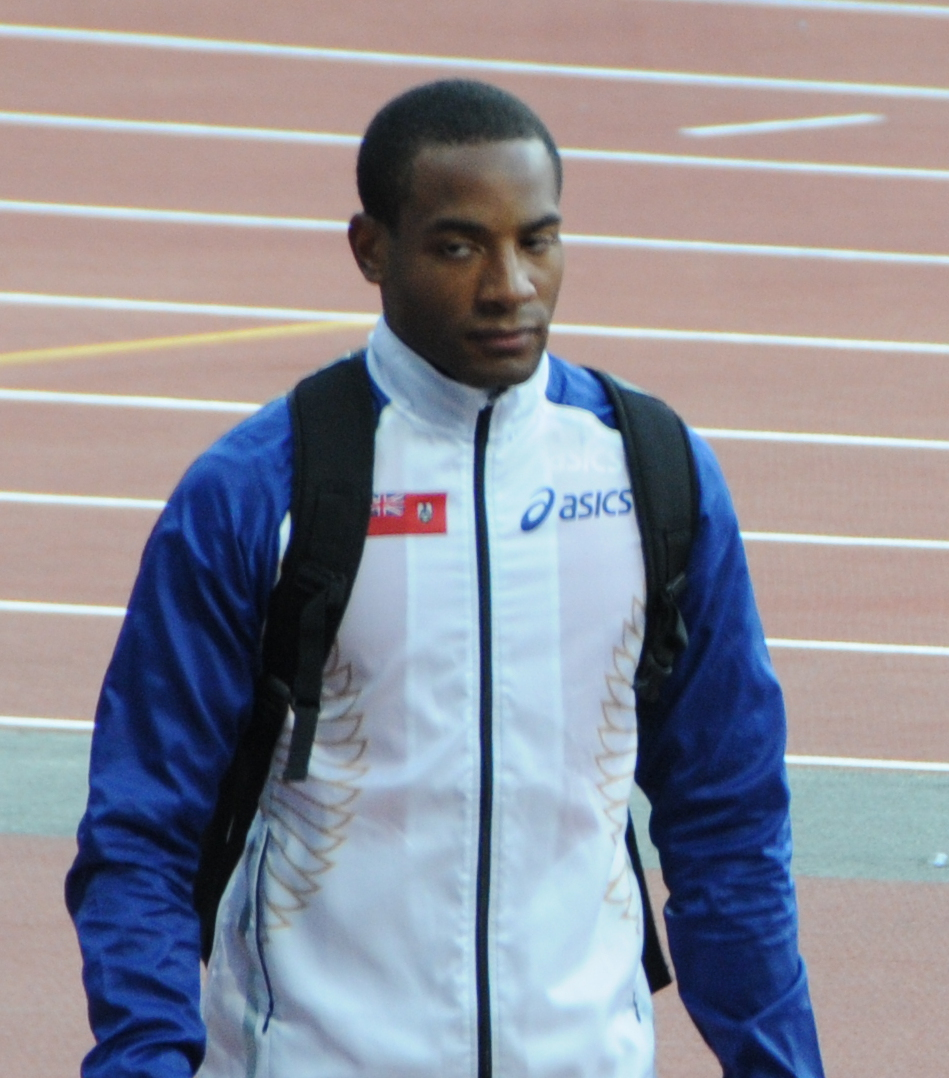
Tyrone Smith

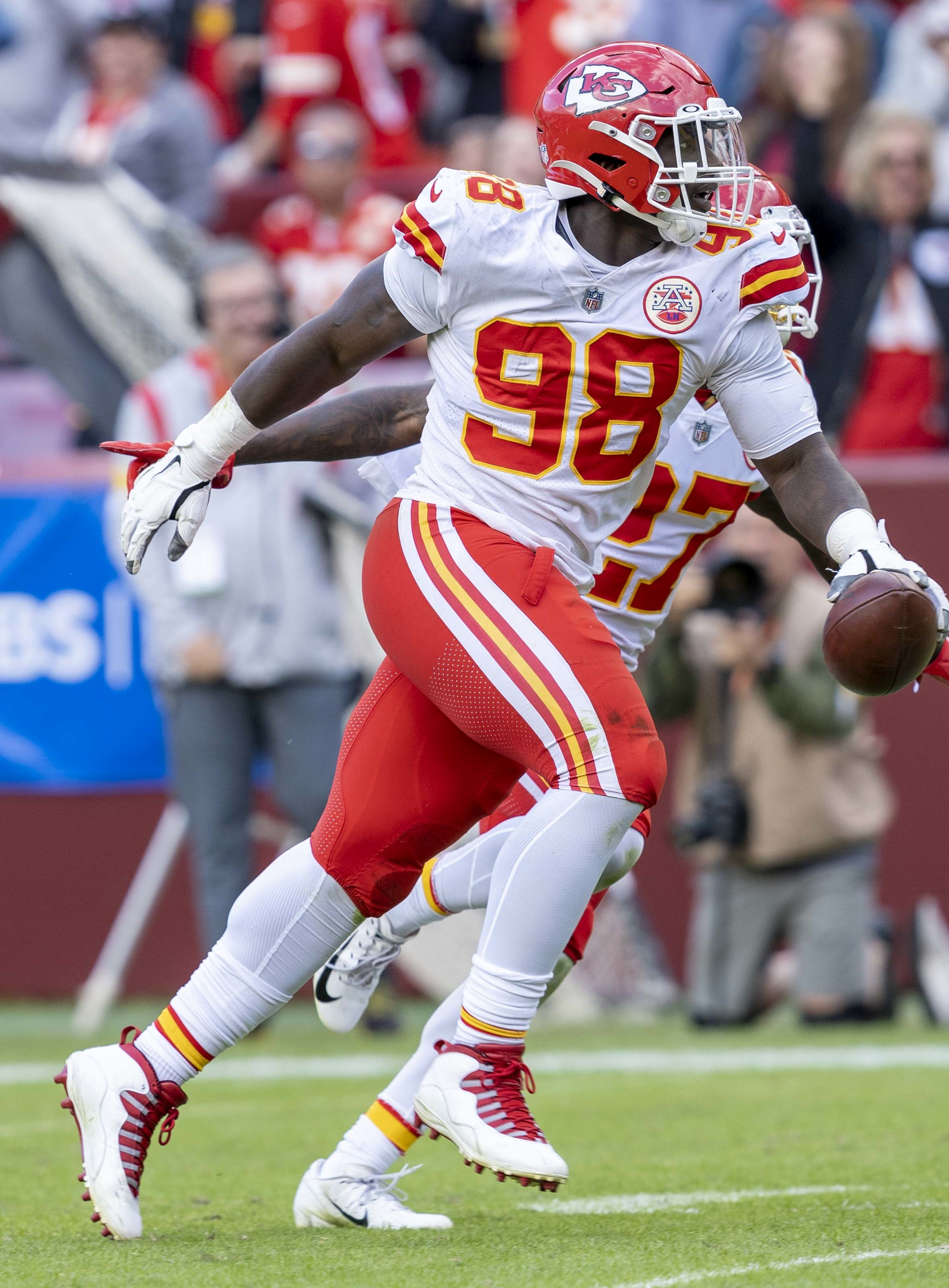
Tershawn Wharton

== Government ==
| Name | Class year | Notability | References |
|---|---|---|---|
| Jay Ashcroft | 1996 (B.S.), 1998 (M.S.) | Missouri secretary of state (2017–2025) | |
| Azli Yusof | 1990 (B.S.) | Member of the Malaysian Parliament for Shah Alam (2022–present) | |
| John Black | circa 1974 (B.S.), circa 1976 (M.S.) | Member of the Missouri House of Representatives (2019–present) | |
| Héctor Boza | 1911 (B.S.) | First vice president of Peru (1950–1956), president of the Senate (1950–1952, 1954–1956) | |
| Bob Bromley | 1981 (B.S.) | Member of the Missouri House of Representatives (2019–present) | |
| Justin Brown | 2002 (B.A.) | Member of the Missouri Senate (2019–present) | |
| Ed Emery | 1972 (B.S.) | Member of the Missouri Senate (2013–2021), member of the Missouri House of Representatives (2003–2011) | |
| Pietro Fiocchi | 1988 (B.S.) | Member of the European Parliament on the Brothers of Italy list (2019–present) | |
| Nicole Galloway | 2004 (B.S.) | Missouri state auditor (2015–2023), Democratic nominee for governor of Missouri in the 2020 election | |
| Jim Guest | 1962 (B.S.), 1970 (M.S.) | Member of the Missouri House of Representatives (2003–2011) | |
| M. K. A. Hameed | 1962 (M.S.) | Member of the Legislative Assembly of India in the Kerala Legislative Assembly (1967–1970) | |
| Hasni Mohammad | circa 1981 (B.S.) | 18th Menteri Besar of Johor (2020–2022), member of the Johor State Legislative Assembly (2008–present), and member of the Johor State Executive Council (2013–2018) in Malaysia | |
| Willard Jenkins | 1959 (B.S.) | Member of the Iowa House of Representatives (1997–2007) | |
| William C. Linton | 1964 (M.S.) | Member of the Missouri House of Representatives (1986–2002) | |
| Don Mayhew | 1991 (B.S.) | Member of the Missouri House of Representatives (2019–present) | |
| Jeff Melcher | 1983 (B.S.) | Member of the Kansas Senate (2013–2017) | |
| Thomas Franklin Fairfax Millard | Transferred out, 1882 | First American political adviser to the Chinese Republic, founder of the China Weekly Review, author of seven influential books on the Far East | |
| Aruna Miller | 1989 (B.S.) | Lieutenant governor of Maryland (2023–present), member of the Maryland House of Delegates (2011–2019) | |
| Rocky Miller | 1988 (B.S.) | Member of the Missouri House of Representatives (2013–2021) | |
| Arthur P. Murphy | circa 1893 | U.S. representative from Missouri (1905–1907, 1909–1911) | |
| Stephanie O'Sullivan | 1982 (B.S.) | Principal deputy director of National Intelligence (2011–2017), associate deputy director of the Central Intelligence Agency (2009–2011) | |
| William R. Painter | circa 1882 (grad. prof. degree) | 28th lieutenant governor of Missouri (1913–1917); Missouri state senator (1923–1930), the first four years during which he was president pro tempore | |
| Michael Person | 1978 (B.S.) | Member of the Missouri House of Representatives (2020–2023) | |
| Mathew Pitsch | 1985 (B.S.), 1986 (M.S.) | Arkansas state senator (2019–2023), member of the Arkansas House of Representatives (2015–2019, majority leader 2017–2019) | |
| Majid bin Abdullah Al Qasabi | 1983 (M.S.), 1985 (Ph.D.) | Minister of Commerce and acting Minister of Media of Saudi Arabia (2020–present) | |
| Boonmark Sirinaovakul | 1983 (M.S.) | Member of the Thailand House of Representatives representing Ratchaburi province (1995–2000), former president of Stamford International University | |
| John Voss | 1985 (B.S.) | Member of the Missouri House of Representatives (2022–present) | |
| Yao Leeh-ter | 1987 (M.S.) | Acting Minister of Education of Taiwan (2018–2019), president of National Taipei University of Technology (2011–2018) | |

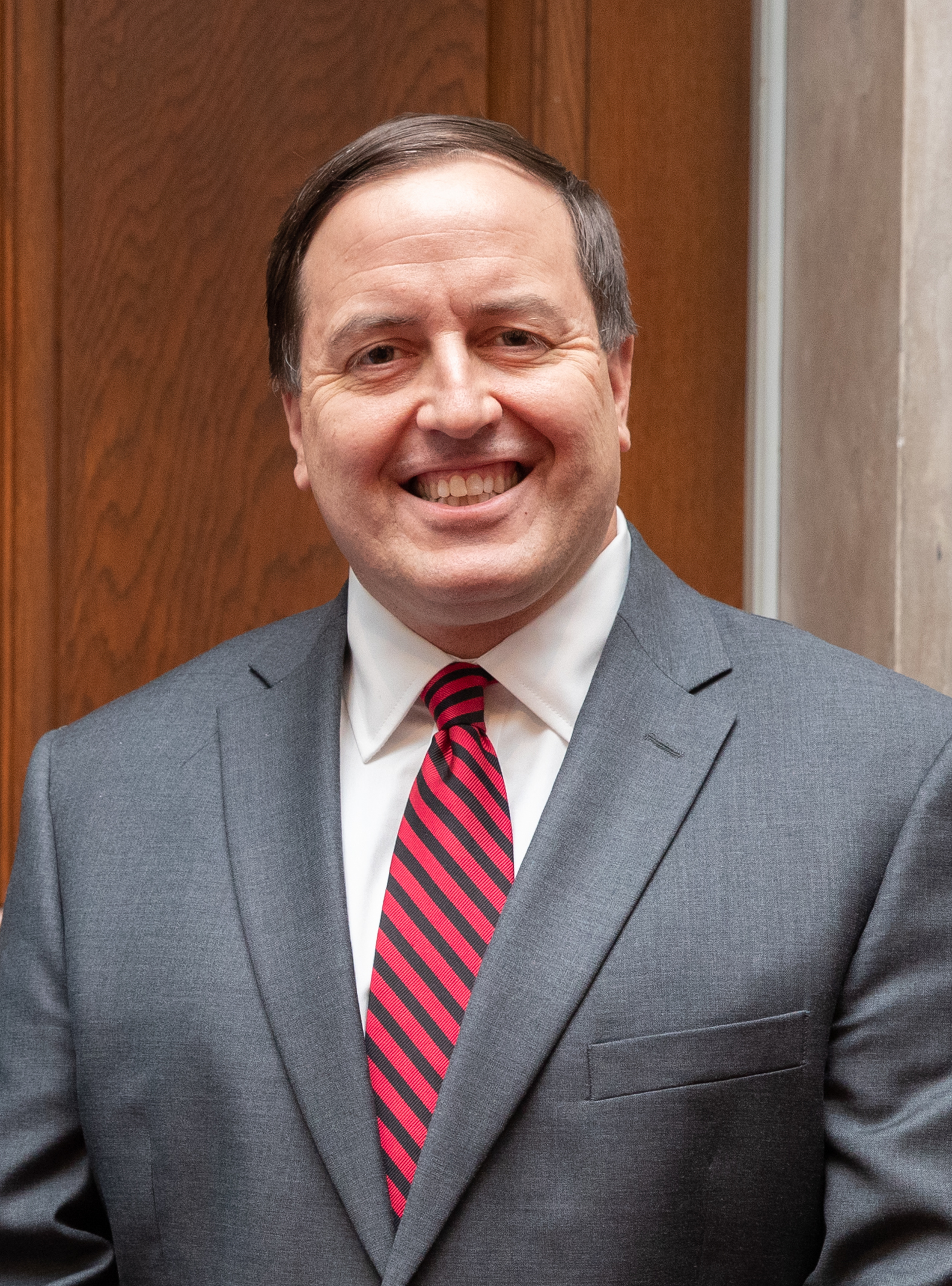
Jay Ashcroft

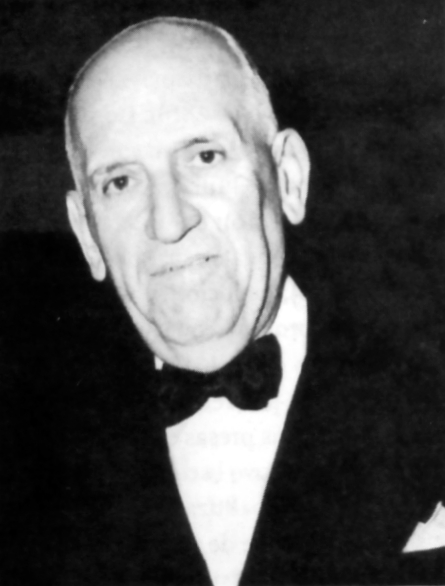
Héctor Boza

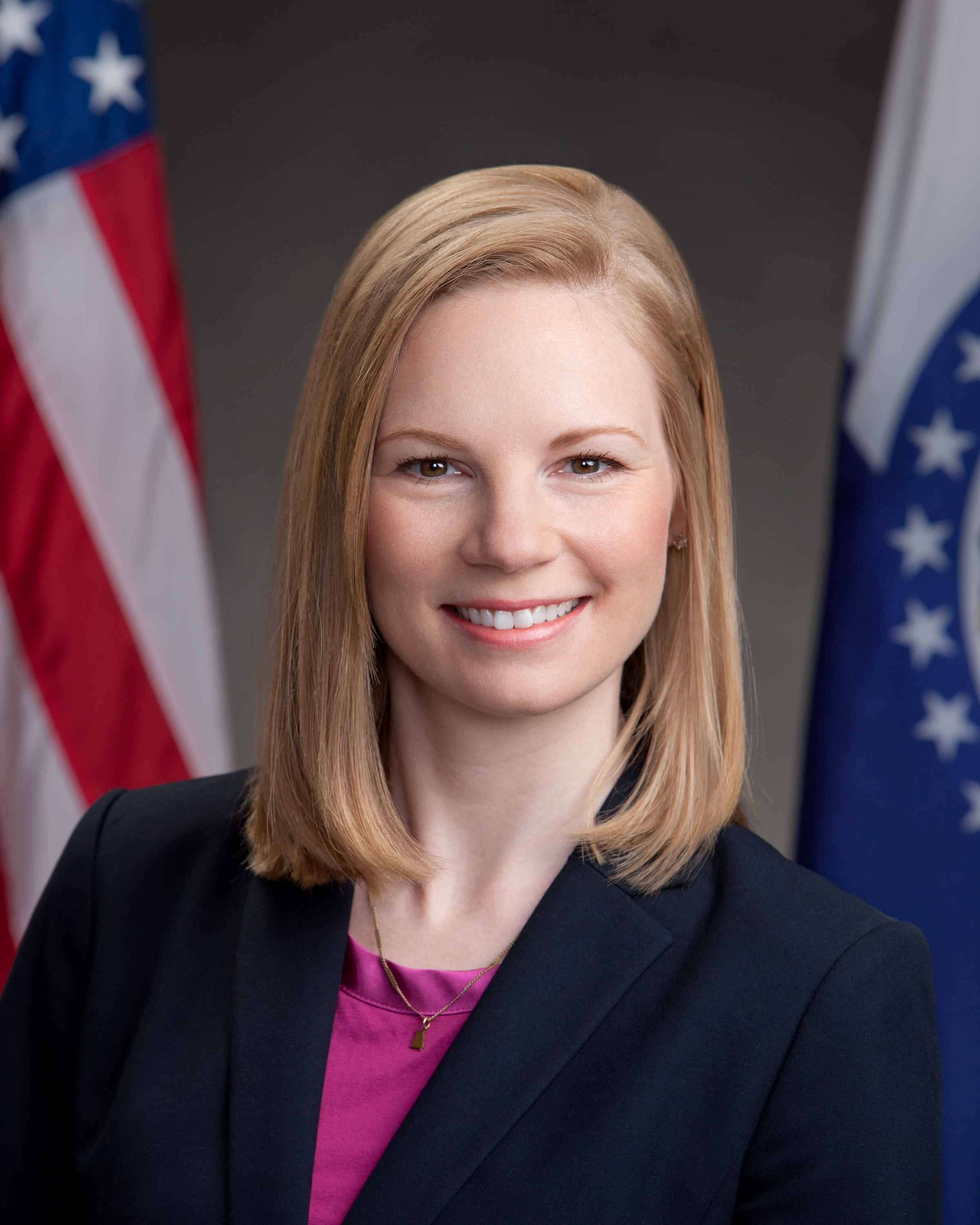
Nicole Galloway

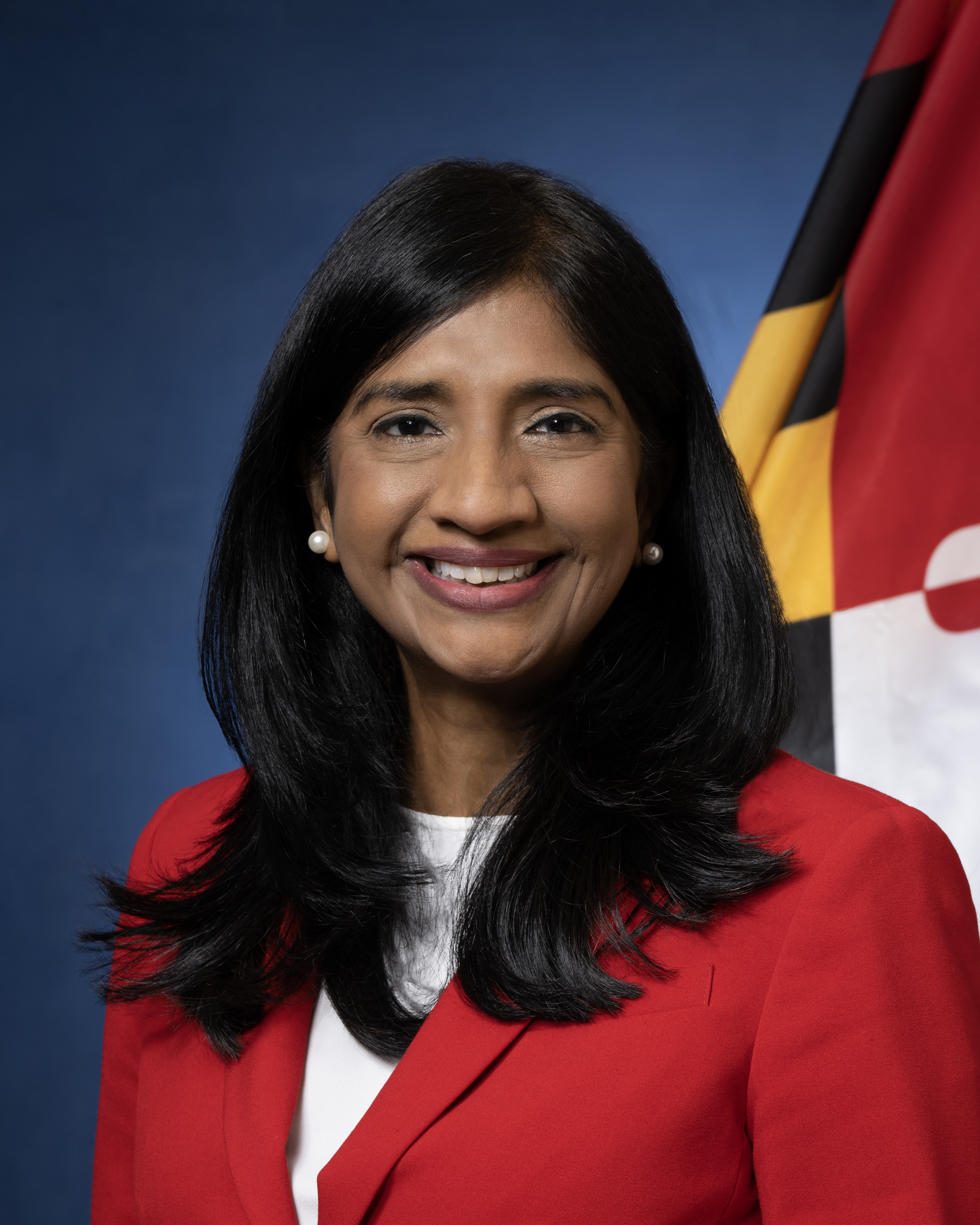
Aruna Miller

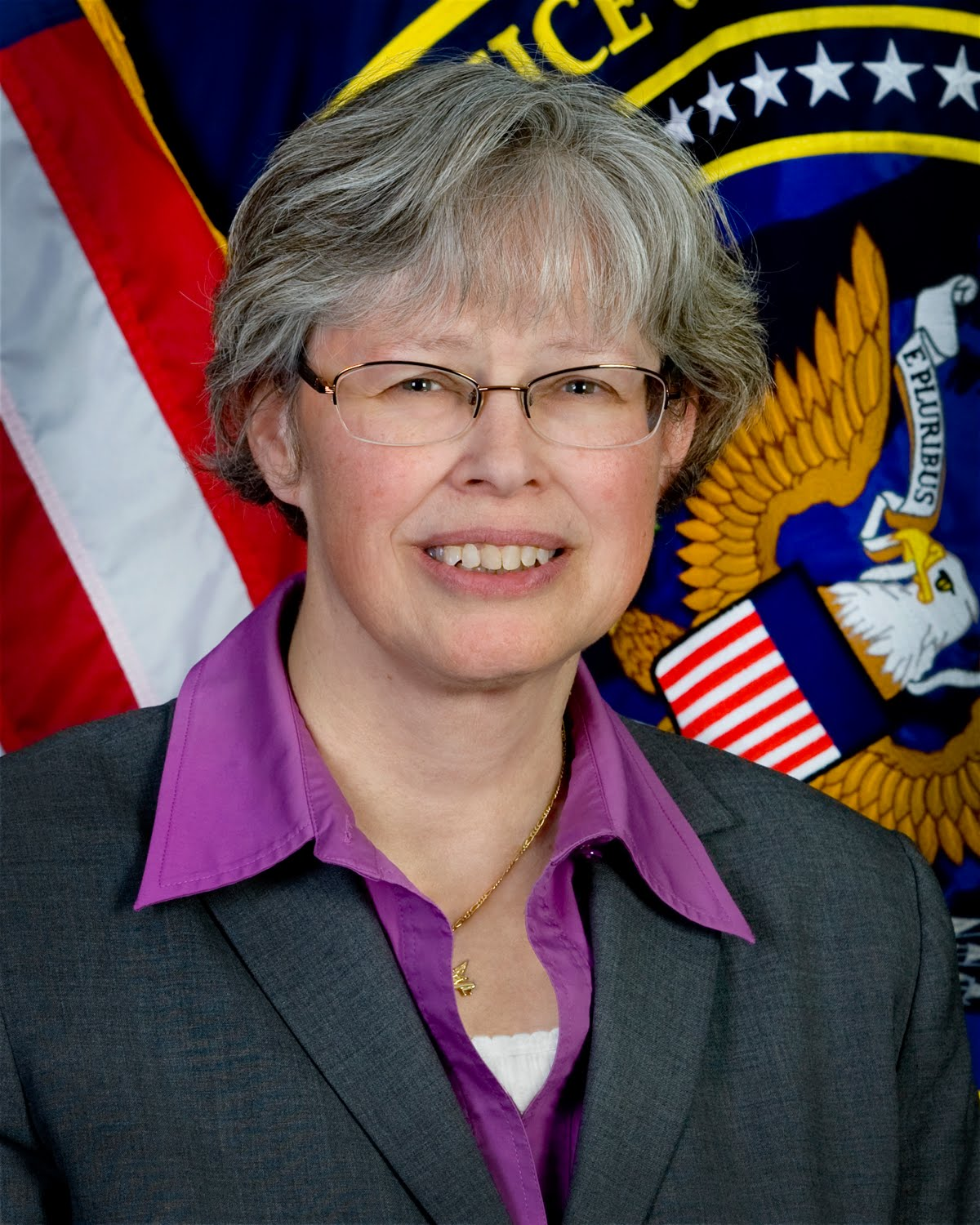
Stephanie O'Sullivan

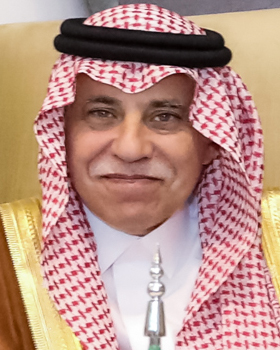
Majid bin Abdullah Al Qasabi

== Military and uniformed services ==
| Name | Class year | Notability | References |
|---|---|---|---|
| Joe N. Ballard | 1972 (M.S.) | Lieutenant general, U.S. Army, chief of Engineers and commander of the U.S. Army Corps of Engineers (1996–2000) | |
| Stephen M. Bliss | 1971 (M.S.) | Brigadier general, U.S. Army, president of the Army and Navy Academy (2002–2014) | |
| Edward S. Fris | 1943 (B.S.) | Lieutenant general, U.S. Marine Corps, commanding general of the Marine Corps Combat Development Command (1974–1975), pioneer in the development of the Marine Air Command and Control System (MACCS) | |
| Emerson C. Itschner | 1959 (D.Eng.) | Lieutenant general, U.S. Army, chief of Engineers (1956–1961), professor of military science and military tactics at Missouri School of Mines and Metallurgy (1934–1936) | |
| Lisa Jaster | 2004 (M.S.) | Major, U.S. Army, one of only three women to graduate from the U.S. Army Ranger School and the first female Army Reserve officer to become a Ranger School graduate | |
| Walter Philip Leber | 1940 (B.S.) | Lieutenant general, U.S. Army, 15th governor of the Panama Canal Zone (1967–1971) | |
| Glenn J. Lesniak | 1979 (M.S.) | Major general, U.S. Army Reserve, deputy chief of the U.S. Army Reserve at the Pentagon (2014–2015) | |
| Mark Quander | 2000 (M.S.) | Major general, U.S. Army, commanding general of the Great Lakes and Ohio River Division of the United States Army Corps of Engineers (2023–present), commandant of cadets of the United States Military Academy (2021–2023), commandant of the United States Army Engineer School (2019–2021) | |
| Brett Sylvia | 1999 (M.S.) | Major general, U.S. Army, commanding general of the 101st Airborne Division and Fort Campbell (2023–present), vice director for strategy, plans, and policy of the Joint Staff (2021–2023), deputy commanding general of the 1st Cavalry Division (2019–2021) | |
| George Allison Whiteman | Enlisted in WWII, 1939 | Second lieutenant, U.S. Air Force, first American pilot killed in aerial combat in World War II while serving under American forces; Whiteman Air Force Base is named after him | |

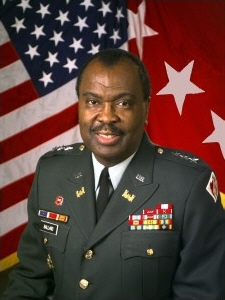
LTG Joe N. Ballard

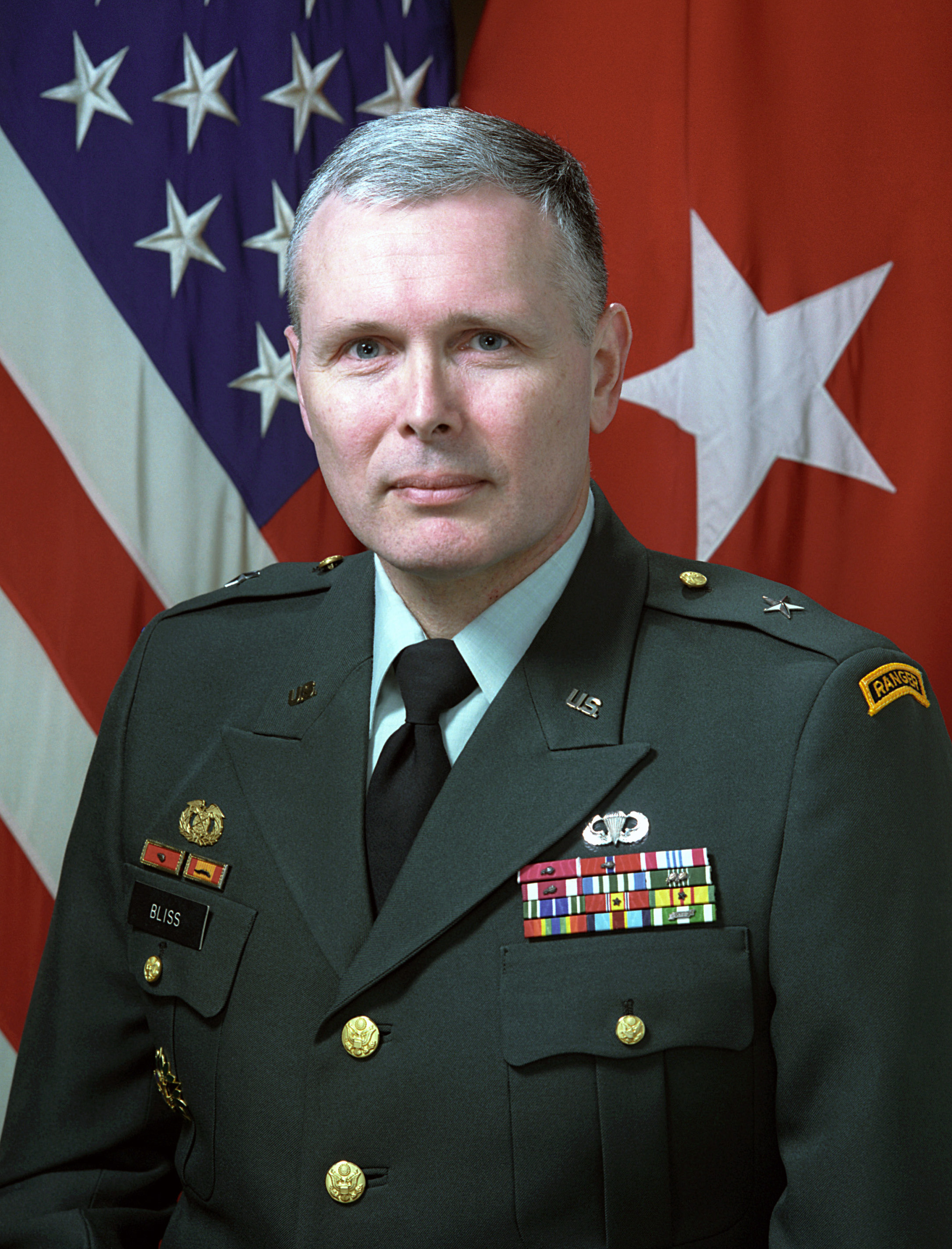
BG Stephen M. Bliss

== NASA ==
| Name | Class year | Notability | References |
|---|---|---|---|
| Thomas Akers | 1973 (B.S.), 1975 (M.S.) | Veteran of four Shuttle flights including flights on Discovery and Endeavour, retired Air Force colonel | |
| Farouk El-Baz | 1961 (M.S.), 1964 (Ph.D.) | Supervisor of Lunar Science Planning and secretary of the Landing Site Selection Committee for the NASA Apollo program (1967–1972) | |
| Ronald Greeley | 1966 (Ph.D.) | Director of the NASA Regional Planetary Image Facility (1998–2000), chair and principal investigator of multiple NASA committees and programs, professor in the School of Earth and Space Exploration (SESE) at Arizona State University (1977–2011) | |
| Janet L. Kavandi | 1982 (M.S.) | Veteran of three Shuttle flights, deputy chief of the Astronaut Office (2005–2008), center director of the NASA Glenn Research Center (2016–2019) | |
| Sandra Magnus | 1986 (B.S.), 1990 (M.S.) | Veteran of three Shuttle flights including STS-135, the final mission of the American Space Shuttle program, executive director of the American Institute of Aeronautics and Astronautics (2012–2018) | |
| George Mueller | 1939 (B.S.) | Led NASA's Office of Manned Space Flight (1963–1969), which oversaw the Apollo program and began development of Skylab and the Space Shuttle program | |

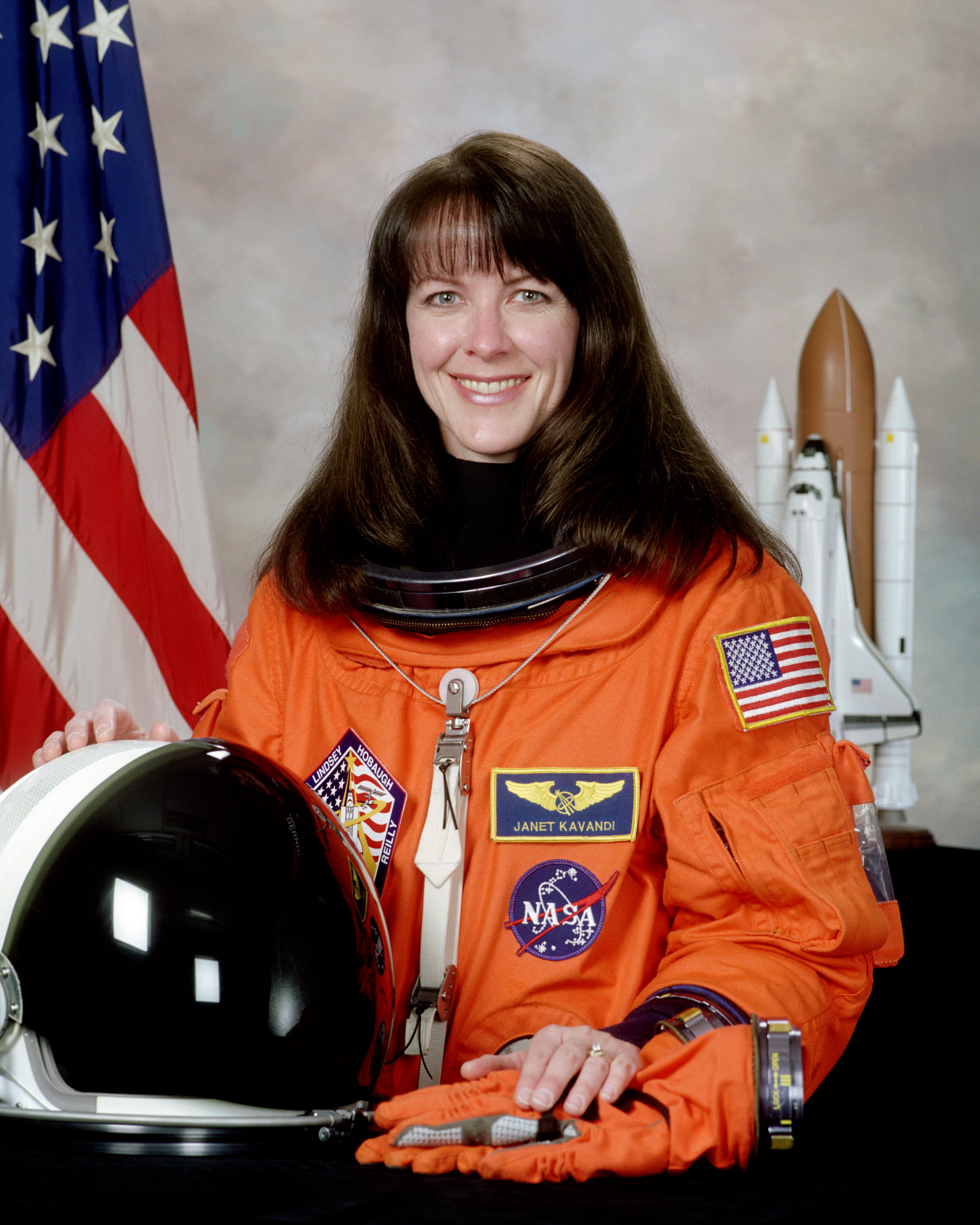
Janet L. Kavandi

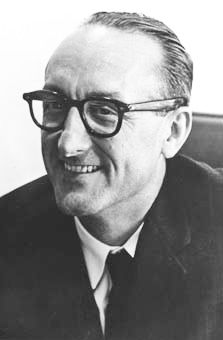
George Mueller

== Religion ==
| Name / Class year / Notability / References; Walter Mitchell / Transferred out, 1895 / Bishop of Arizona in The Episcopal Church (1926–1946) |

== Science and research ==
| Name | Class year | Notability | References |
|---|---|---|---|
| Robert Banks | circa 1942 (B.S.) | Chemist who co-invented crystalline polypropylene and high-density polyethylene, inducted into the National Inventors Hall of Fame in 2001 | |
| Terry Bollinger | 1977 (B.S.), 1980 (M.S.) | Computer scientist who was influential in preventing free and open-source software from being banned in U.S. DoD systems | |
| Charles C. Copeland | 1962 (B.S.) | Engineer known for pioneering energy-conserving innovations for infrastructure projects in New York City | |
| Clyde Cowan | 1940 (B.S.) | Co-discoverer of the neutrino by the Cowan–Reines neutrino experiment, whose contributions earned the Nobel Prize in Physics in 1995, captain in the U.S. Army Air Forces | |
| Danny Lee Fread | 1961 (B.S.), 1969 (M.S.), 1971 (Ph.D.) | Hydraulic engineer best known for his computer-based mathematical simulation programs for rainfall and runoff to forecast the flow of flooding rivers and dam failures | |
| George W. Hellmuth | 1891 | Architect who designed several notable buildings including the Sanitol Building, the International Fur Exchange Building, and the Steelcote Manufacturing Company Paint Factory | |
| Daniel C. Jackling | 1892 (B.S.) | Pioneered the exploitation of low-grade porphyry copper through new methods such as open-pit mining that created the Bingham Canyon Mine, the largest man-made excavation in the world, founded the Utah Copper Company which is now Kennecott Utah Copper | |
| Mervin Kelly | 1914 (B.S.) | President of Bell Laboratories (1951–1959) | |
| Shi Changxu | 1948 (M.S.) | Materials scientist who was an academician with the Chinese Academy of Engineering and the Third World Academy of Sciences; the asteroid 28468 Shichangxu is named after him | |

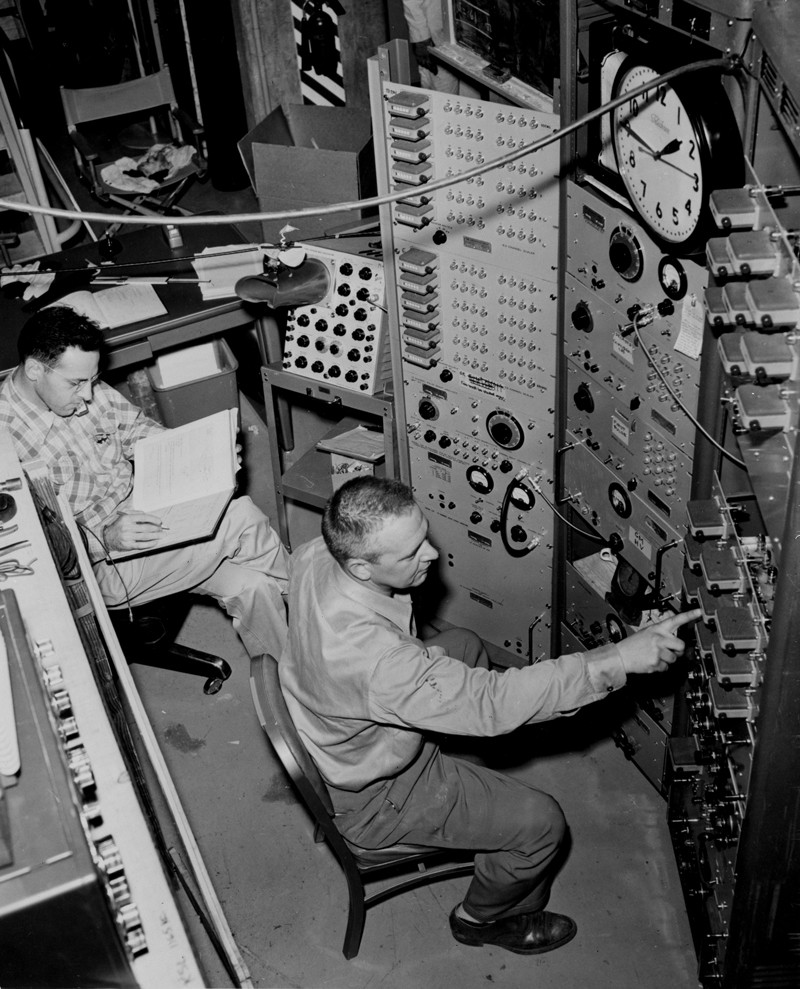
Clyde Cowan

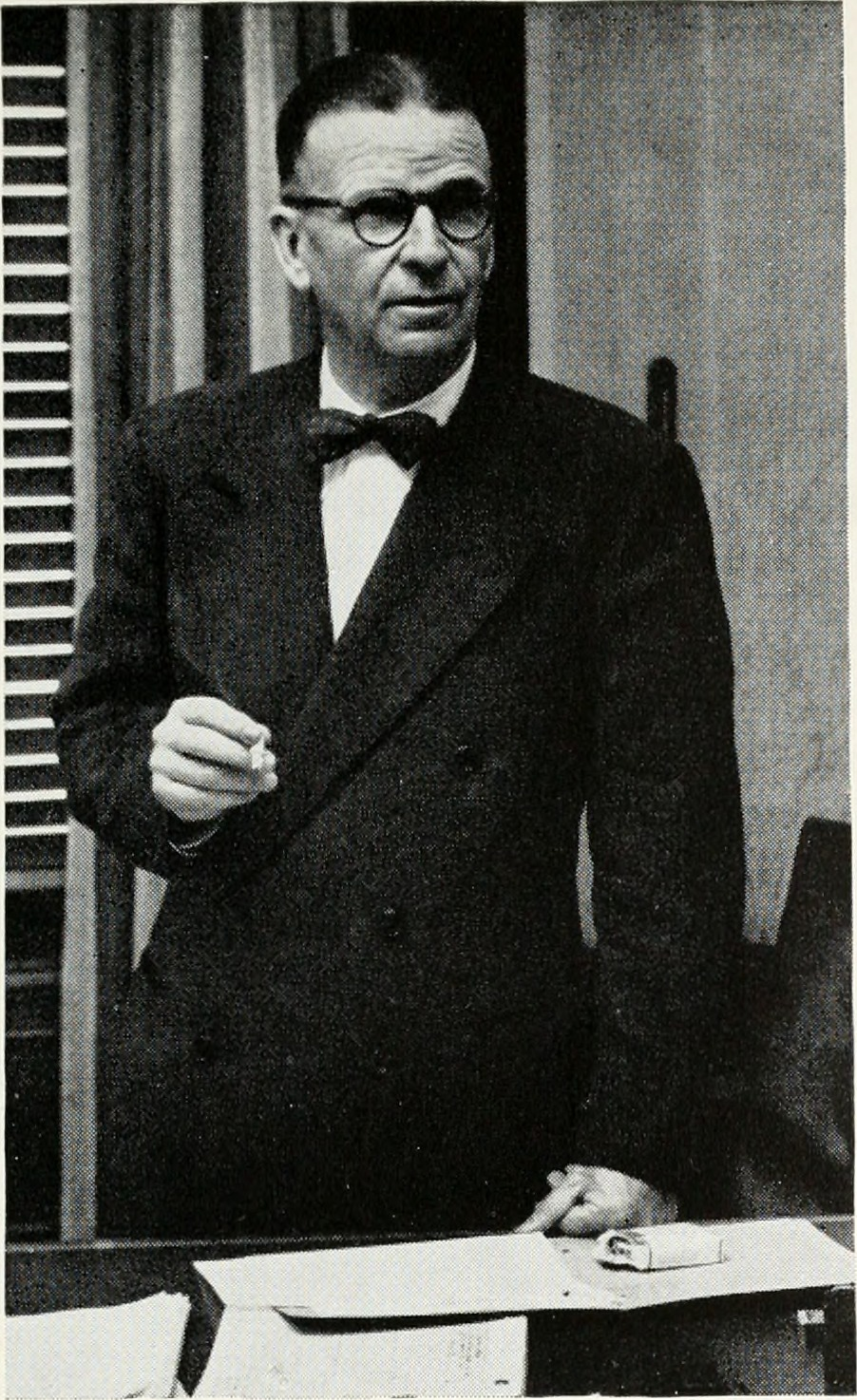
Mervin Kelly
