= Value Expectations =

- Type: Daily
- Format: Weblog
- Owner(s): The Applied Finance Group
- Founded: September 2008
- Website: Value Expectations

Value Expectations (VE) is a stock blog and investment newsletter. Value Expectations was created by Dan Obrycki and Rafael Resendes, the founders of The Applied Finance Group and Toreador Research and Trading. Value Expectations is an interface for investors and is meant to serve as an outlet covering topics on corporate performance and equity valuation.

== Founders ==
Rafael Resendes

Prior to co-founding AFG, Resendes was a member of the Chicago Board of Trade and served as director of research for HOLT Value Associates. Rafael graduated Phi Beta Kappa from The University of California, Berkeley, with a Bachelor of Science in Finance and Economic Analysis and obtained an MBA from the University of Chicago.

Dan Obrycki

Prior to co-founding AFG, Obrycki was the Manager of Research for a portfolio consulting firm, HOLT Value Associates. Daniel graduated summa cum laude from the University of Missouri-Rolla with a BS in Geological Engineering and obtained his MBA with a Finance Specialization from the University of Chicago.

== History ==
Value Expectations was launched in November 2008 by The Applied Finance Group to serve as a Weblog that provides research to investors. Value Expectations has been a featured on USNews.com, TheStreet.com, and as frequent contributors on RealClearMarkets.com and Seeking Alpha.

Value Expectations' blogs cover topics such as corporate performance and equity valuation.

In July, 2009 Value Expectations began providing research globally, researching companies outside the U.S. for the first time.

In August, 2009 Value Expectations established the Market Forecast Project, a survey of professional investors concerning current economic issues.
