= Waterman Place-Kingsbury Place-Washington Terrace Historic District =

Historic district in Missouri, United States

- U.S. National Register of Historic Places
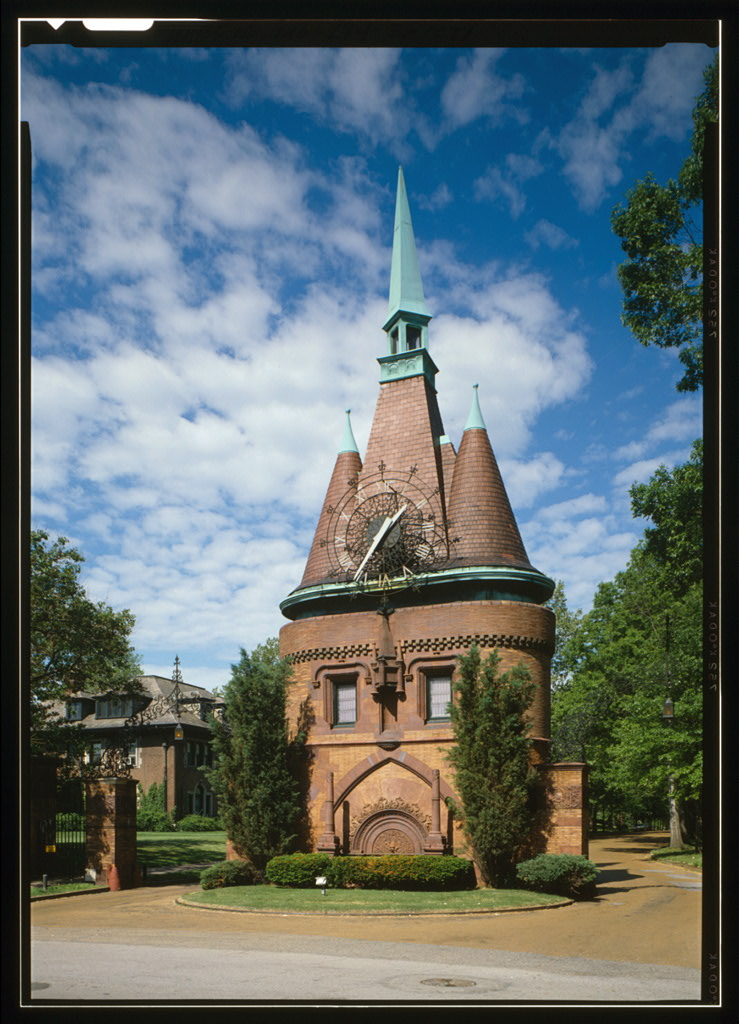
- Washington Terrace gate

- Location within St. Louis Location within Missouri
- Location: Bounded by Union Blvd., alley S of Waterman Place, Belt Ave., alley S of Kingsbury Place, Clara Ave., alley line bet, St. Louis, Missouri
- Coordinates: 38°38′56″N 90°16′34″W
- Area: 66.7 acres (27.0 ha)
- Architect: Barnett, Haynes & Barnett; George W. Hellmuth
- Architectural style: Late 19th and 20th Century Revivals, Colonial Revival
- NRHP reference No.: 07000549
- Added to NRHP: June 12, 2007

The Waterman Place-Kingsbury Place-Washington Terrace Historic District in St. Louis, Missouri is a historic district which was listed on the National Register of Historic Places in 2007. The listing included 223 contributing buildings, four contributing structures, and a contributing site on 66.7 acres (27.0 ha). It also includes 15 non-contributing buildings and three non-contributing structures.

It includes part or all of Washington Terrace (St. Louis), which is just one block long. The district is bounded by Union Boulevard, the alley south of Waterman Place, Belt Ave., the alley south of Kingsbury Place, Clara Ave., and the former alley line between Washington Terrace and Delmar.

It includes works by architects Barnett, Haynes & Barnett and architect George W. Hellmuth.

Of the contributing buildings, 97 are historic garages or carriage houses.

Works involving George W. Hellmuth are:

- the one contributing site: a terraced garden at 14 Waterman Place (1909) which was created by Hellmuth & Spearing.
- 14 Waterman Place (1904), a two-story brown brick Colonial Revival house designed by G. W. Hellmuth
- 94 Waterman Place (1911), a two-story red brick Colonial Revival house designed by Hellmuth & Hellmuth.
- 21 Waterman Place (1901), three-story Colonial Revival light brown brick house designed by G.W. Hellmuth
- 33 Waterman Place (1913), Colonial Revival red brick house with a slate roof, designed by Hellmuth & Hellmuth
- 71 Waterman Place (1900), Colonial Revival two-story light brown brick house, designed by G.W. Hellmuth
- 6 Kingsbury Place (1912), three-story Italian Renaissance house designed by Hellmuth & Hellmuth
- 20 Kingsbury Place (1911), Italian Renaissance, designed by Hellmuth & Hellmuth
- 15 Kingsbury Place (1906), three-story Beaux Arts house
- 39 Kingsbury Place (1909), three-story Colonial Revival house designed by Hellmuth & Spiering
- 63 Kingsbury Place (1915), three-story Colonial Revival house designed by Hellmuth & Hellmuth
- 48 Washington Terrace (1909), Tudor Revival designed by Hellmuth & Spiering

Also possibly designed by G.W. Hellmuth is:

- 57 Waterman Place (1902), three-story brown brick house "very similar to Hellmuth's 21 Waterman Place from the previous year"
