= André Taylor =

American scientist

André D. Taylor
- Education: Missouri University of Science and Technology; Georgia Tech; University of Michigan
- Scientific career
- Workplaces: Yale University; New York University Tandon School of Engineering
- Thesis: Design, fabrication, and integration of a fuel cell for a hybrid micro power system. (2005)
- Website: TMD Lab

André Taylor is an American scientist who is an associate professor of chemical engineering at the New York University Tandon School of Engineering. Taylor works on novel materials for energy conversion and storage. He was awarded the Presidential Early Career Award for Scientists and Engineers in 2010, and named as one of The Community of Scholars' Most Influential Black Researchers of 2020.

== Early life and education ==
Taylor attended Smith-Cotton High School in Missouri. As a high school student he spent a year as an exchange student in Spain. He played basketball and soccer, and was a National Merit Scholar and member of the National Honor Society. He graduated in 1991 and moved to the Missouri University of Science and Technology to study chemical engineering. Taylor was a graduate student at Georgia Tech before joining the University of Michigan to complete his doctoral research. Throughout his studies Taylor held various positions in chemistry industries, including working for DuPont and General Motors. Taylor was a member of the Boy Scouts of America, and achieved the status of Eagle Scout. He has said that this experience emphasized the importance of preserving planet Earth.

== Research and career ==
Taylor led the Transformative Materials and Devices research laboratory at Yale University where he developed new materials for energy conversion. There he focused on carbon-based solar cells that made used of small molecule and polymer semiconductors.

Taylor joined the New York University Tandon School of Engineering in 2018, where continued to develop materials and devices for energy conversion, with a particular focus on perovskite solar cells. Perovskite cells could potentially be cheaper than the traditional silicon solar cells. The perovskite solar cells incorporate a P-I-N sandwich-like structure, where the P and N layers transport holes and electrons, respectively. The I layers are the intrinsic layers that are responsible for generating electron-hole pairs when exposed to light. Perovskites make appropriate materials because they absorb light across a broad spectral range. Taylor worked on the phenyl-C61-butyric acid methyl ester (PCBM) electron transport layer, developing simple ways to fabricate uniform layers using spray-coating on top of the crystalline surface. He and his colleagues developed a scalable process that is suitable for manufacturing solar panels on a large scale with high reproducibility.

Alongside electron transport layers, Taylor has studied electromagnetic interference (EMI) blocking films, which limits damage to smartphones and other wearable technologies. The films consist of MXenes, two-dimensional transition metal carbides that are highly conductive and the ability to shield from electromagnetic interference.

Taylor has worked on electrochemical fuel cells and batteries. In lithium-ion batteries, the electrodes are typically composed of two-dimensional nanosheets, with the anodes (negative electrodes) made from graphitic carbon nitride. Unfortunately, whilst graphitic carbon nitride are low-cost and scalable, they have poor conductivity and are poor storage capacity for sodium-ions, meaning they cannot simply be used for sodium-ion batteries. He proposed the use of graphitic carbon nitride electrodes coated in a mixture of asphalt and urea. The altered stacked multilayer graphitic carbon electrodes are chemically stable and can enhance the sodium ion storage capacity.

== Awards and honors ==
- 2010 Presidential Early Career Award for Scientists and Engineers
- 2010 National Science Foundation CAREER Award
- 2011 Yale Greer Memorial Prize
- 2014 Martin Luther King Jr. Visiting Scholar
- 2020 The Community of Scholars Most Inspiring Black scientists in America

== Selected publications ==
- Zheng, Y., Kong, J., Huang, D., Shi, W., McMillon-Brown, L., Katz, H. E., ... & Taylor, A. D. (2018). Spray coating of the PCBM electron transport layer significantly improves the efficiency of pin planar perovskite solar cells. Nanoscale, 10(24), 11342–11348. doi: doi.org/10.1039/C8NR01763H
- Jing-Shun Huang; Tenghooi Goh; Xiaokai Li; et al. (5 May 2013). "Polymer bulk heterojunction solar cells employing Förster resonance energy transfer". Nature Photonics. 7 (6): 479–485. doi:10.1038/nphoton.2013.82. ISSN 1749-4885. Wikidata Q59186954.
- Yeonwoong Jung; Xiaokai Li; Nitin K Rajan; André D Taylor; Mark A Reed (17 December 2012). "Record high efficiency single-walled carbon nanotube/silicon p-n junction solar cells". Nano Letters. 13 (1): 95–99. doi:10.1021/nl3035652. ISSN 1530-6984. PMID 23237412. Wikidata Q59186958.
- Marcelo Carmo; Ryan C. Sekol; Shiyan Ding; Golden Kumar; Jan Schroers; André D. Taylor (3 March 2011). "Bulk metallic glass nanowire architecture for electrochemical applications". ACS Nano. 5 (4): 2979–2983. doi:10.1021/nn200033c. ISSN 1936-0851. PMID 21370891. Wikidata Q83522071.
