= Louis C. Spiering =

American architect

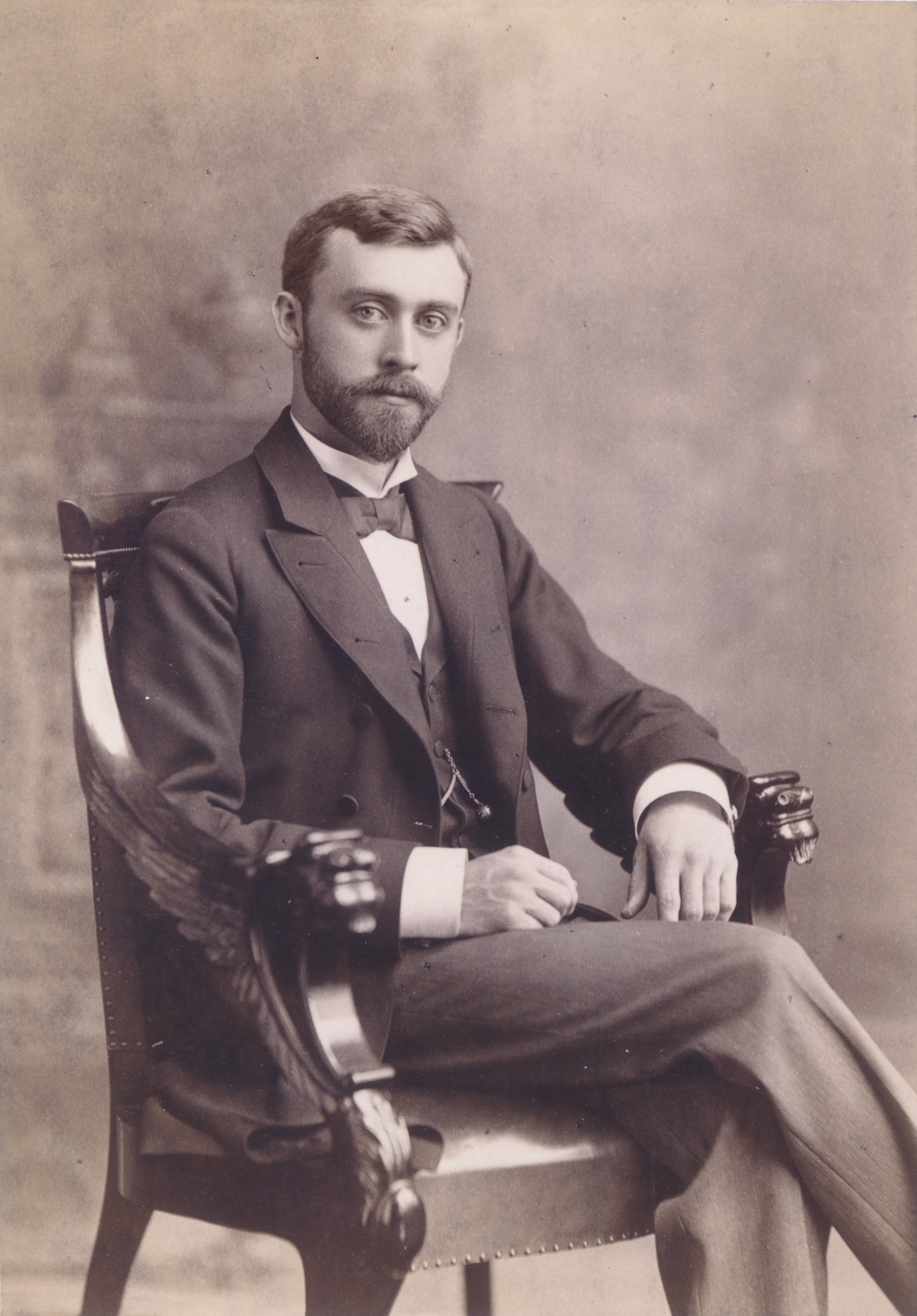
Louis C. Spiering

Louis Clemens Spiering (May 8, 1874 — March 9, 1912) was an American architect and architecture professor based in St. Louis, Missouri, who worked on building designs for the St. Louis World's Fair of 1904 and other local commissions. He died at the age of 37.

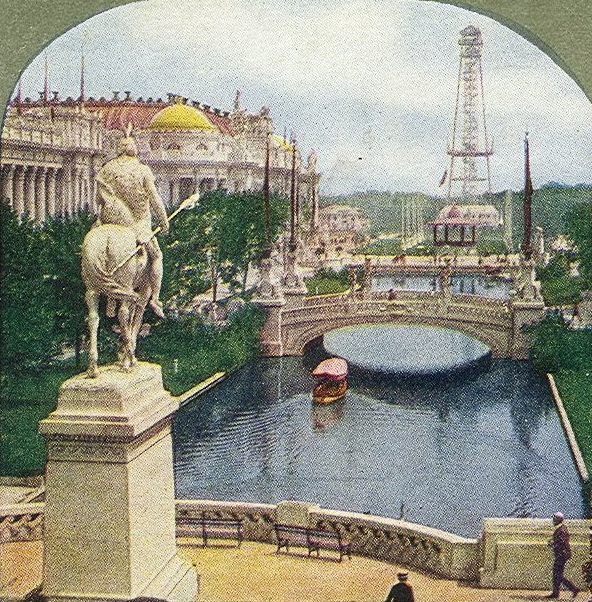
East Lagoon of the St. Louis World's Fair of 1904 with the wireless telegraph tower in the background.

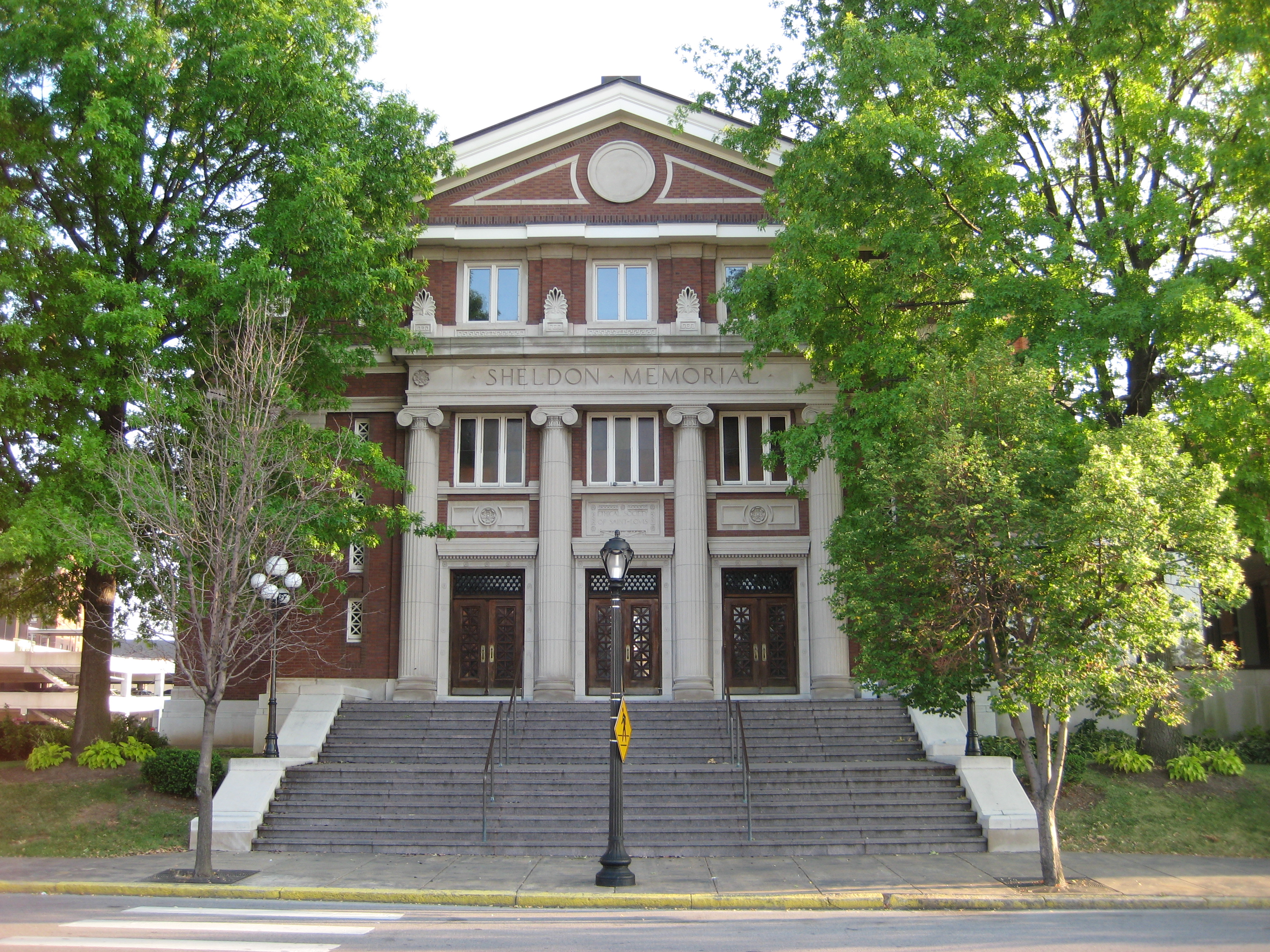
The Sheldon concert hall, designed by Louis C. Spiering.

== Family and education ==
Louis Clemens Spiering was born in St. Louis in 1874, the middle of three children of Theresa (Bernays) Spiering and Ernst Spiering, a violinist and orchestra conductor. His elder brother Theodore became a violinist, and his maternal grandfather was Karl Ludwig Bernays, a German-born Marxist journalist who changed his name to Charles Louis Bernays when he emigrated to St. Louis.

Spiering attended Webster Public School and then was sent to Berlin, Germany, for schooling at the Realgymnasium, from which he graduated in 1891. After two semesters studying architecture at the Berlin Royal School of Technology, he returned stateside to take up a position with Chicago architect William A. Otis.

In 1895, Spiering returned to Europe to enter the École des Beaux-Arts in Paris, from which he graduated in 1902. Along the way, he won a prize in sculpture at the École des Arts Décoratifs, and he studied in the atelier of Noel-Marcel Lambert, the architect in charge of restoration at the Palace of Versailles.

Although the Beaux-Arts style came to signify a type of neoclassicalism in architecture, a critic was later to observe of Spiering that what he gained from his Paris training was actually a "freedom to design in whatever format he thought appropriate to the circumstances."

== Architectural career ==
In 1902, Spiering returned to St. Louis and took up a position as assistant to E. L. Masqueray, the chief of design for the 1904 Louisiana Purchase Exposition, better known as the St. Louis World's Fair. For the succeeding eighteen months, Spiering worked on a wide range of elements for the fair, including the general layout of the grounds and specific buildings such as the Palais du Costume, the wireless telegraph tower, the express office, the horticulture building, and the restaurant pavilions and colonnades on Art Hill. He was also Superintending Architect for the French and Austrian governments' buildings.

Spiering opened his own practice in 1903. Among his local commissions were a new building for the Artists Guild (commissioned in 1907), the Soulard Branch Library (commission won in a design competition in partnership with George W. Hellmuth), and the Sheldon Memorial Building for the St. Louis Ethical Society, now a concert hall.

He also set up a design studio in the then-new architecture program at the Washington University in St. Louis and ran evening classes for working draftspeople. He was a member of the American Institute of Architects.

Spiering fell ill in 1910 (possibly of appendicitis) and never completely recovered, dying two years later.
