= Steelcote Manufacturing Company Paint Factory =

- U.S. National Register of Historic Places
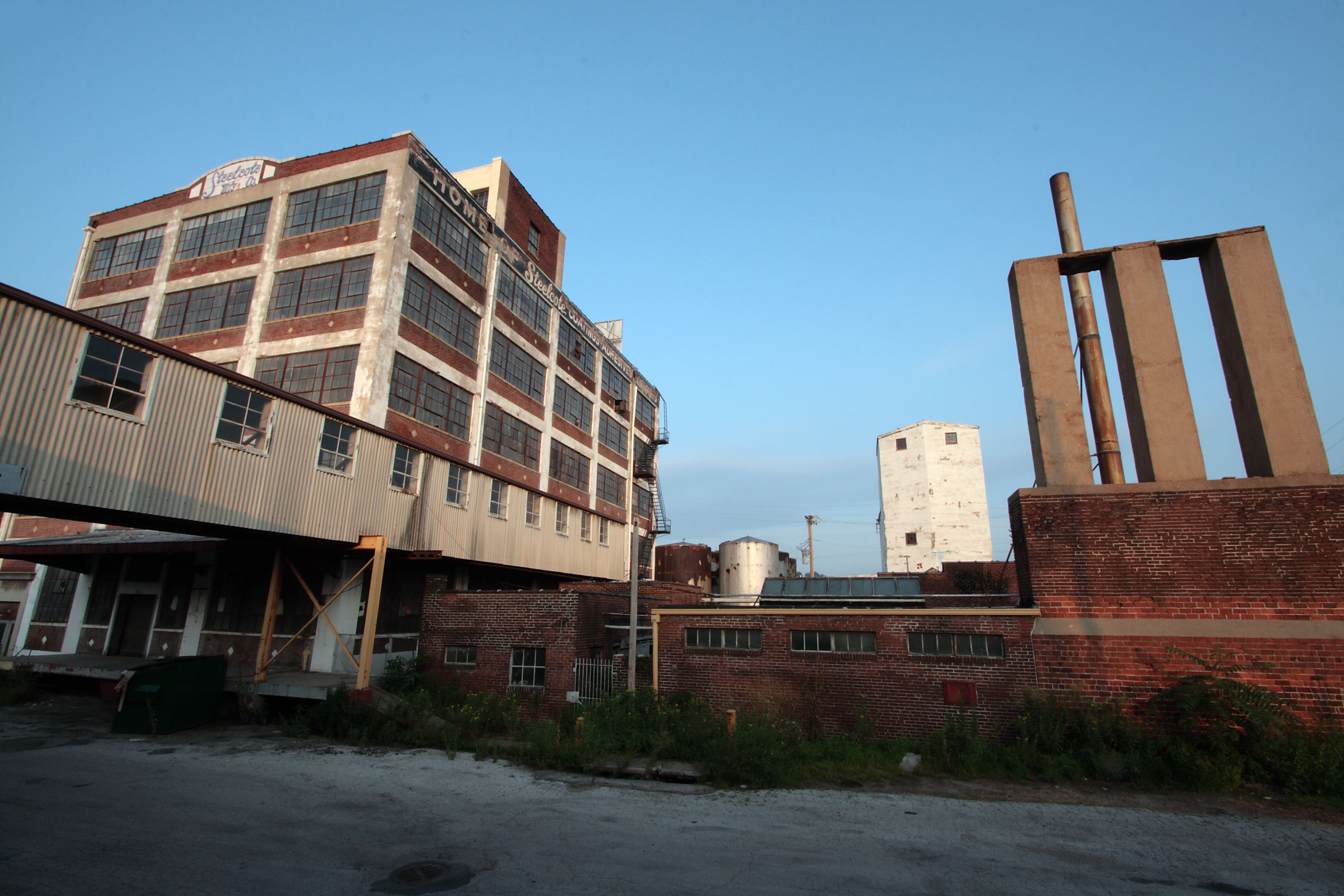
- Photo in 2017

- Location within Missouri Location within the United States
- Location: 801 Edwin, St. Louis, Missouri
- Coordinates: 38°37′43″N 90°14′02″W
- Area: 0.8 acres (0.32 ha)
- Built: 1922, 1924, 1929
- Built by: Joseph Bright Construction Co.
- Architect: Hellmuth & Hellmuth
- NRHP reference No.: 07000620
- Added to NRHP: June 27, 2007

The Steelcote Manufacturing Company Paint Factory, at 801 Edwin in St. Louis, Missouri, was built in 1922. It was listed on the National Register of Historic Places in 2007.

The paint factory is significant in part as "the only remaining extant site of the four Steelcote Manufacturing Company sites"; the firm operated only in St. Louis during its independent existence.

It was designed by architects Hellmuth & Hellmuth, a firm founded by George W. Hellmuth (1870-1955) and his brother Harry Hellmuth. It is believed to be the first building in St. Louis constructed with a floating foundation, implementing a technique created by architects Burnham and Root of Chicago.

It was built by Joseph Bright Construction Co.

The listing includes 801 Edwin and also "Steelcote Square Number 5" (3418 Gratiot).

There is an office building built in 1922.

The main building is a five-story industrial warehouse/factory building, built an exposed concrete structure. It has concrete piers; it is three bays wide and five bays deep. Between the piers are steel industrial windows above concrete sills above red brick. Its first three floors were completed in 1924; the top two floors and two "penthouses" were added in 1929. One penthouse is the top of the elevator system.

In 2018, renovations began on the factory building to turn it into rental lofts by Pier Property Group, who still owns it today; other buildings in the complex are also being renovated for future shopping and housing. The building opened for occupancy in 2020. Today it is known and included as Steelcote Square, which includes the two sister properties, Steelcote Flats (Mill Creek Flats) and Steelcote Crossing.
