= International Fur Exchange Building =

- U.S. National Register of Historic Places
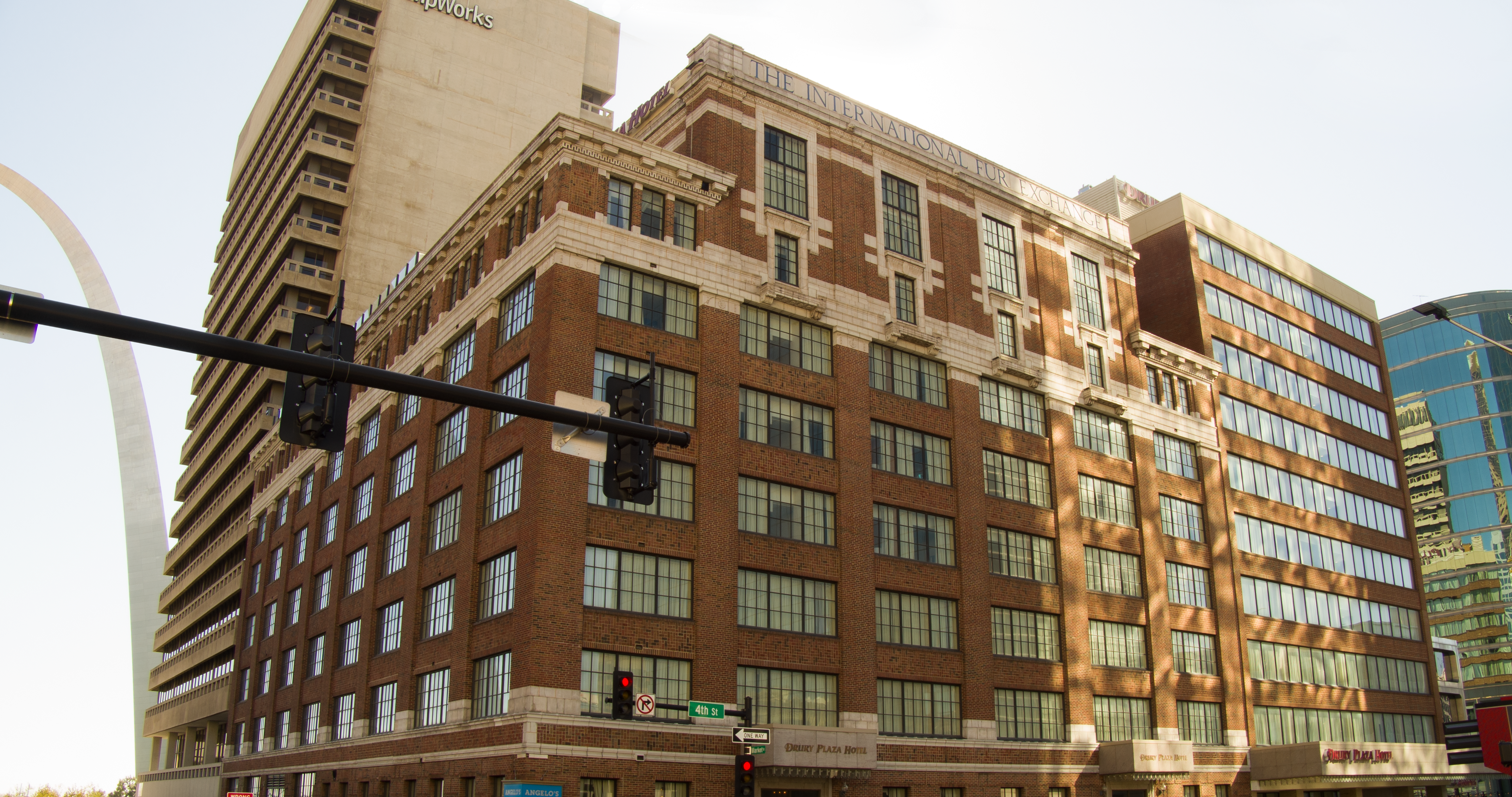

- Location within Missouri Location within the United States
- Location: 2 S. Fourth St. St. Louis, Missouri 63102-1809
- Coordinates: 38°37′25″N 90°11′18″W
- Area: less than one acre
- Built: 1919-20
- Architect: George W. Hellmuth
- Architectural style: Early Commercial
- NRHP reference No.: 98000313
- Added to NRHP: April 13, 1998

The International Fur Exchange Building, at 2 S. Fourth St. in St. Louis, Missouri, was listed on the National Register of Historic Places in 1998.

The original building is a seven-story commercial building, on a 125 by 150 feet (38 m × 46 m) plan, designed by architect George W. Hellmuth. It was built during 1919–20.

It has also been known as the Fouke Fur Company Building. It was site of fur auctions. The Fouke Fur Company held all rights, by an exclusive contract with the United States Government, "for the processing and sale of all sealskins and foxskins taken from Government herds on the Pribilof Islands in the Bering Sea. In addition, from 1920- 1925 and again from 1934-1956." Public auctions of its fur seal pelts were held here.

A ten-story addition on the south, added in 1958, has compatible design. The building experienced some demolition in 1997, mostly on the building's interior, with removal of salvageable materials. However, some of the building maintained external damage during the demolition. In 1997, Drury Hotels acquired the International Fur Exchange Building property, and, along with the Thomas Jefferson Building and American Zinc building, saved them from being demolished and renovated all three into a single building, now called the Drury Plaza Hotel at the Arch. During renovation, all three buildings were added to the National Register of Historic Places.
