= Sanitol Building =

- U.S. National Register of Historic Places
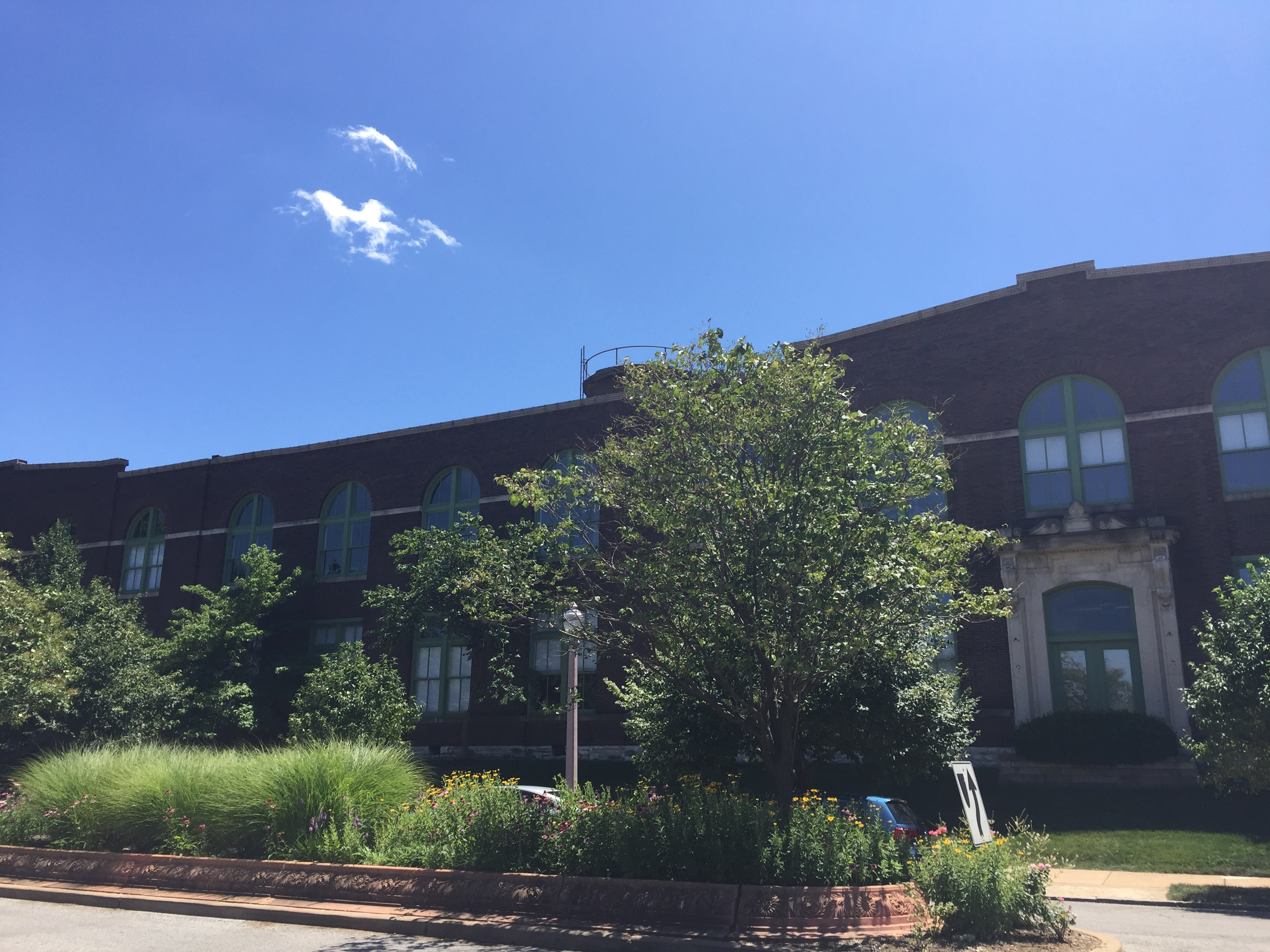

- Location within Missouri
- Location: 4252-4264 Laclede Ave., St. Louis, Missouri
- Coordinates: 38°38′16″N 90°15′04″W
- Area: less than one acre
- Built: 1906
- Architect: George W. Hellmuth
- Architectural style: Classical Revival
- NRHP reference No.: 85003362
- Added to NRHP: October 21, 1985

The Sanitol Building, at 4252-64 Laclede Ave. in St. Louis, Missouri, was built in 1906. It was listed on the National Register of Historic Places in 1985.

It is a two-story red-brown brick building, on a limestone foundation, which was built as a factory and offices building for the Sanitol Chemical Laboratory Company. It was designed by architect George W. Hellmuth, and it includes Classical Revival detailing.
