= Rafael Resendes =

Co-founder of The Applied Finance Group, managing director at Applied Finance Advisors, and Co-founder Applied Finance Capital Management. Resendes was raised in Atwater, California and moved to Chicago, Illinois in 1989 after receiving his bachelor's degree.

== Education ==
Resendes graduated from The University of California, Berkeley with a Bachelor of Science in Finance and Economic Analysis. Resendes went on to earn his MBA from the University of Chicago. Resendes is a member of Phi Beta Kappa society.

== The Applied Finance Group ==
Rafael Resendes co-founded The Applied Finance Group (AFG) in 1995 with Dan Obrycki. Resendes helped create AFG's proprietary framework, Economic Margin (EM), to evaluate corporate performance from an economic cash flow perspective. In 2003 Resendes relocated from Chicago to Fresno, California to work as the head of office when AFG expanded to California.

== Applied Finance Advisors ==
Resendes is a portfolio manager for Applied Finance Advisors and is jointly responsible for the day-to-day management of the Fund's portfolio, including stock selection and investment monitoring. Resendes' has been a commenter on market topics for publications such as Institutional Investor, Barron's, Forbes and The Wall Street Journal.

== Other Ventures ==
Prior to co-founding AFG, Resendes was a member of the Chicago Board of Trade and served as director of research for HOLT Value Associates. Resendes has also contributed his insight to various news outlets such as CNBC, CNN, Fox News, RealClearPolitics. In 2003 Resendes began serving on the CFA Institute's Speaker Retainer Program speaking to over 30 Financial Analyst Societies in 8 countries. Resendes has also served as a guest speaker for various equity valuation seminars. Rafael is a guest lecturer at University of California at Berkeley, and has served as an adjunct professor at DePaul University in Chicago. Resendes is also a frequent guest speaker at the National Investor Relations Institute.
