= George W. Hellmuth =

American architect (1870-1955)

George William Hellmuth (1870-1955) was an American architect based in St. Louis, Missouri.

Hellmuth educated at the Missouri School of Mines and worked in a practice with Louis Spiering. He also worked with his brother Harry at the firm Hellmuth and Hellmuth Architects. His son, George F. Hellmuth was also a noted architect.

== Works ==
A number of his works are listed on the National Register of Historic Places.

- Albert Bond Lambert House (1902–03), St. Louis, Missouri
- Sanitol Building (1906), 4252-4264 Laclede Ave., St. Louis, Missouri, NRHP-listed
- R.E.M. Bain House (1909)
- International Fur Exchange Building (1919–20), 2-14 S. Fourth St., St. Louis, Missouri, NRHP-listed
- Steelcote Manufacturing Company Paint Factory (1922–29), 801 Edwin, St. Louis, Missouri (Hellmuth & Hellmuth), NRHP-listed

Works involving George W. Hellmuth in the Waterman Place-Kingsbury Place-Washington Terrace Historic District, in St. Louis, are:

- 71 Waterman Place (1900), Colonial Revival two-story light brown brick house, designed by G.W. Hellmuth
- 21 Waterman Place (1901), three-story Colonial Revival light brown brick house designed by G.W. Hellmuth
- 14 Waterman Place (1904), a two-story brown brick Colonial Revival house designed by G. W. Hellmuth
- 15 Kingsbury Place (1906), three-story Beaux Arts house designed by G.W. Hellmuth
- 39 Kingsbury Place (1909), three-story Colonial Revival house designed by Hellmuth & Spiering
- 48 Washington Terrace (1909), Tudor Revival designed by Hellmuth & Spieringv
- the one contributing site: a terraced/sunken garden at 14 Waterman Place (1909) which was created by Hellmuth & Spearing.
- 94 Waterman Place (1911), a two-story red brick Colonial Revival house designed by Hellmuth & Hellmuth.
- 20 Kingsbury Place (1911), Italian Renaissance, designed by Hellmuth & Hellmuth
- 6 Kingsbury Place (1912), three-story Italian Renaissance house designed by Hellmuth & Hellmuth
- 33 Waterman Place (1913), Colonial Revival red brick house with a slate roof, designed by Hellmuth & Hellmuth
- 63 Kingsbury Place (1915), three-story Colonial Revival house designed by Hellmuth & Hellmuth
- 5564 Bartmer Ave (1904), Three-story brick Federal house designed by G.W. Hellmuth commissioned by Julia B. Hellmuth (mother)

Also possibly designed by G.W. Hellmuth is:

- 57 Waterman Place (1902), three-story brown brick house "very similar to Hellmuth's 21 Waterman Place from the previous year"
