= Gene Haertling =

American engineer

Gene H. Haertling is an American engineer currently the Bishop Distinguished Professor Emeritus of Ceramic Engineering at Clemson University and is an Elected Fellow of the Institute of Electrical and Electronics Engineers and National Academy of Engineering for the development of transparent ferroelectric ceramics and new generations of electronic ceramic devices.

He also created a new invention that helps improve the making of ceramics.

== Education ==
Haertling received a BS in Ceramic Engineering from University of Missouri-Rolla in 1954, and a MS in 1960 and PhD in 1961, both in Ceramic Engineering from University of Illinois at Urbana-Champaign.
