= Metal carbido complex =

Coordination complex that contains a carbon atom as a ligand

A metal carbido complex is a coordination complex that contains a carbon atom as a ligand. They are analogous to metal nitrido complexes. Carbido complexes are a molecular subclass of carbides, which are prevalent in organometallic and inorganic chemistry. Carbido complexes represent models for intermediates in Fischer–Tropsch synthesis, olefin metathesis, and related catalytic industrial processes. Ruthenium-based carbido complexes are by far the most synthesized and characterized to date. Although, complexes containing chromium, gold, iron, nickel, molybdenum, osmium, rhenium, and tungsten cores are also known. Mixed-metal carbides are also known.

== Carbido clusters ==
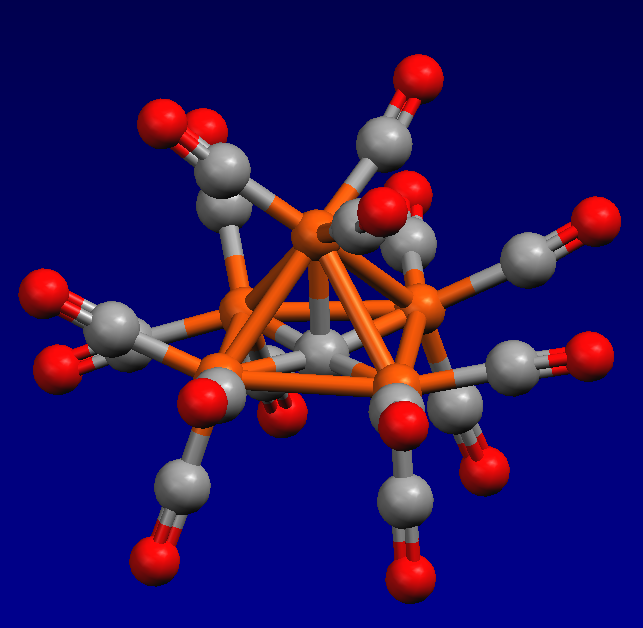
Structure of Fe_{5}C(CO)_{15}.

Most molecular carbido complexes are clusters, usually featuring carbide as a six-fold bridging ligand. Examples include [Rh_{6}C(CO)_{15}]^{2−}, and [Ru_{6}C(CO)_{16}]^{2−}. Though exceptions exist, such as the nonanuclear Ruthenium cluster (μ-C)Ru_{9}(CO)_{14} (μ^{3}-η^{5}: η^{2}:η^{2}-C_{9}H_{7})_{2,} containing a tripped trigonal prism geometry around the carbide.

The iron carbonyl carbides exist not only in the encapsulated carbon ([Fe_{6}C(CO)_{16}]^{2−}) but also with exposed carbon centres as in Fe_{5}C(CO)_{15} and Fe_{4}C(CO)_{13.}

Bimetallic and exotic clusters such as metal carbide clusterfullerenes (MCCF's) have also been able to be prepared.

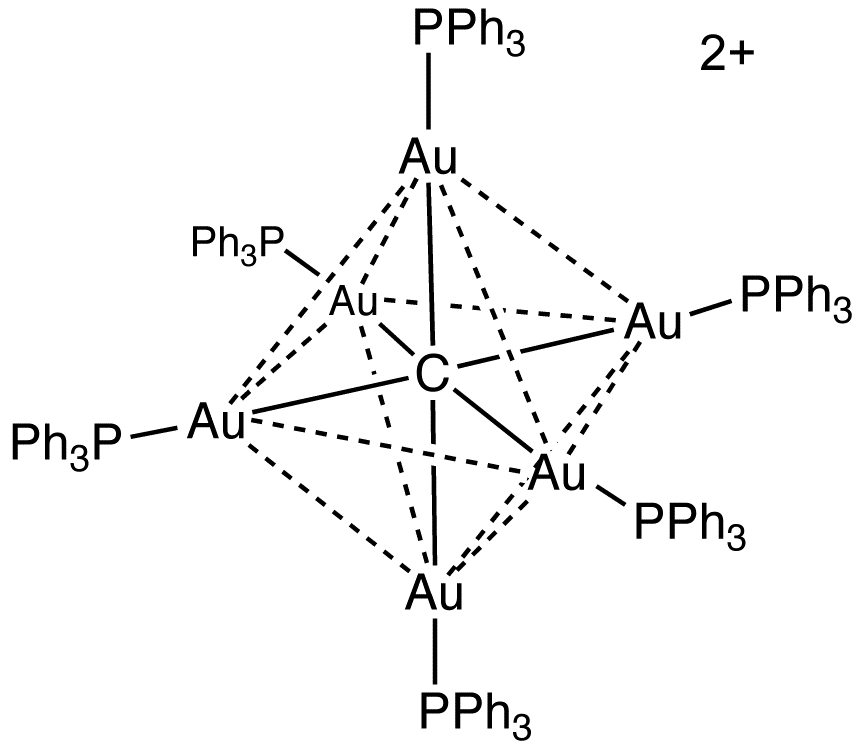
The complex Au_{6}C(PPh_{3})_{6}]^{2+}, containing a carbon-gold core.

== Doubly bridging carbide ligands ==
Bridging carbido ligands can be subdivided into three classes:

- cumulenic L_{n}M=C=M'L_{n},
- metallocarbyne L_{n}M≡C−M'L_{n}, and
- polar covalent L_{n}M≡C:→M'L_{n}.

Cumulenic compounds generally bridge two metal atoms of the same element and are symmetrical. However, there are exceptions to this.

In contrast, metallocarbyne compounds are generally constitutionally heterobimetallic, with complexes containing varying coordination geometries being common. These moieties have been able to serve as precursors to elaborate molecular scaffolds such as porphyrin derivatives.

The polar covalent class is distinguished from metallocarbynes by a very fine line. This carbide-metal interaction is considered labile in nature. Carbon here can be understood fundamentally as being similar to CO ligands, that is, dative (L-type). Although, this class has also been described to some extent being analogous to the behavior of Lewis acid adduct-forming terminal nitrido and oxo complexes e.g. (PMe_{2}Ph)_{2}Cl-Re≡N-BCl_{3} and tBu(CH_{2})_{3}(Br)W=O-AlBr_{3}.

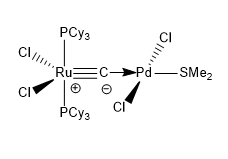
Zwitterionic canonical depiction of polar covalent metal-carbide bond

== Terminal carbides ==
In rare cases, carbido ligands are terminal. One example is RuC(PCy_{3})_{2}Cl_{2} with a Ru-C distance of 163 pm, typical for a triple bond. The complex can be obtained by metathesis of vinyl acetate to give [Ru(CH-p-C_{6}H_{4}Me)(PCy_{3})_{2}Cl_{2}] results in a metastable Ru(Cl_{2})(PCy_{3})_{2}C_{2}HOAc complex, which eliminates acetic acid.

Such transition metal, one coordinate-carbon bonded complexes are comparable to carbon monoxide, cyanide, and isonitrile analogues. These carbides can be used as synthons to access a wide range of carbyne complexes, the most notable being Fischer carbynes. American chemist Christopher C. Cummins is one of the pioneers of this area.

== Preparative routes and characterization ==
=== Carbido clusters ===
Synthesis of carbido clusters can be accomplished by hydrolysis, thermolysis of labile ligands, thermal rearrangements, and photolysis. Their synthesis has historically been crudely achieved by serendipitous chance following apparent random molecular organization. One example is the following reaction:

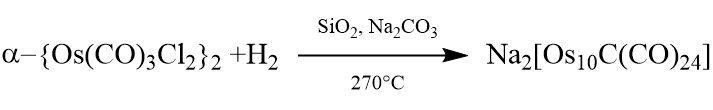

=== Doubly bridging carbide ligands ===
==== Cumulenic ====
Synthetic routes to cumulenic carbido complexes can be efficient and lead to rapid, near quantitative product formation with simple purifications. This dimerization involves the formation of a vinylidene from an alkyne. Mechanistically, there are various proposed pathways, starting with oxidative addition of the alkyne to the metal core, followed by either intramolecular 1,2-H shifts or intermolecular 1,3-H shifts. For Ruthenium coordination complexes, bridging Ru-Cl bond lengths have been observed to lie in the range of 1.76-1.8 Å. Ru-C bonds can vary significantly as a result of trans effect phenomena which is caused by the respective ethylene and vinylidene ligands.

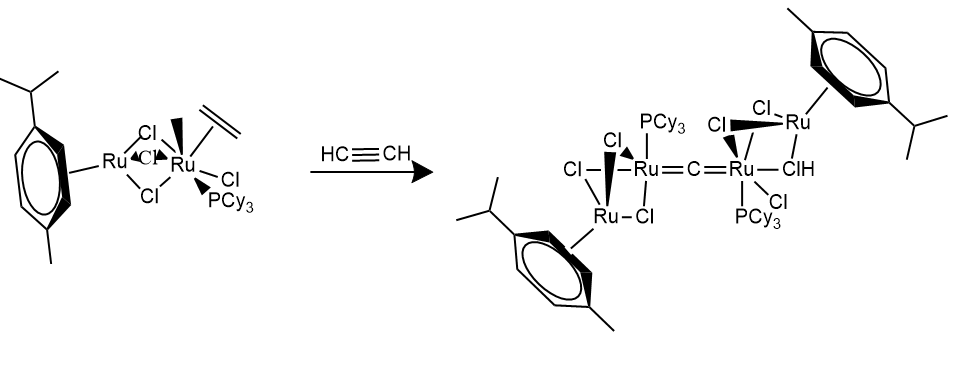
Acetylene-based synthesis of cumulenic carbido complex

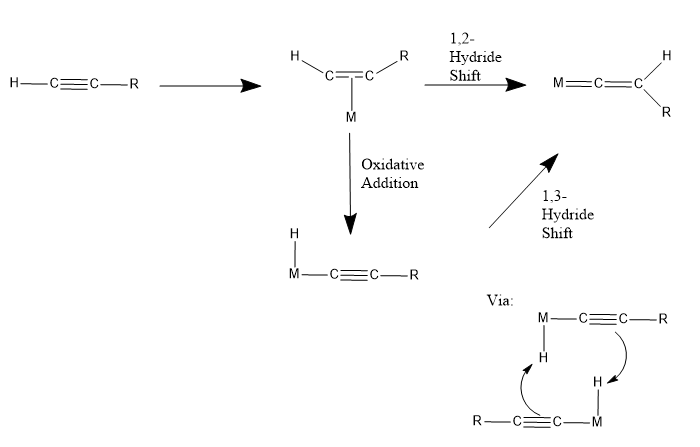
Proposed hydride shift mechanisms for alkyne being transformed into vinylidene

==== Metallocarbyne ====
The appropriate halocarbyne precursors of choice can be reacted with organolithium reagents to afford the respective lithiocarbyne derivate by virtue of lithium/halogen exchange. This species can serve as a lynchpin for subsequent carbide linkage with an additional metal complex. Phosphine-based analogues were first introduced by Templeton and co. These types of complexes can be characterized crystallographically and are distinguishable by their C_{s} symmetry.

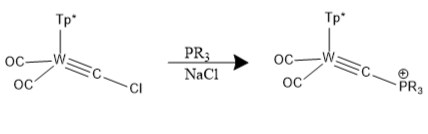
Synthesis of Templeton Phosphoniocarbyne

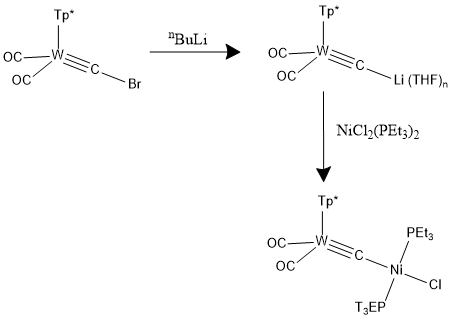
Common synthetic route for bridging carbido complex

==== Polar covalent ====
Addition of tricyclohexylphosphine to the carbene complex (PPh_{3})_{2}(Cl)_{2}Ru=C(CHCO_{2}Me)_{2} results in olefin extrusion and yields an air stable anionic carbido complex. This species displaces a dimethyl sulfide ligand from PdCl_{2}(SMe)_{2} to give the μ-carbido bimetallic complex (PCy_{3})_{2}Cl_{2}Ru≡C-PdCl_{2}(SMe_{2}). Spark towards a novel type of bonding was proposed following empirical observations wherein the carbido-palladium interaction could be readily disturbed. Reversible coordination ensues upon exposure of the bimetallic complex to carbon monoxide. Additionally, no coordination occurs if the anionic carbido complex contains bulky ligands such as H_{2}IMes. This indicates that the thermodynamic sink towards making the C-M bond is not very favorable, suggesting a weak interaction. Although not intuitive, characterization of this type of bonding can be inferred if ^{13}C NMR shifts are observed to be far downfield, and C-M bond lengths are similar to those of complexes proven to contain carbon-based σ-donor ligands such as [(Et_{2}H_{2}Im)PdCl(μ-Cl)]_{2.}

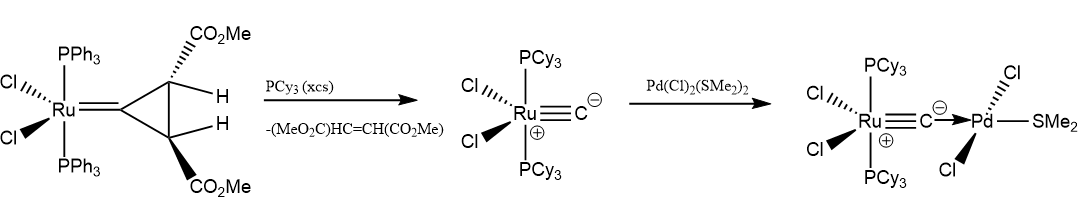
Preparation of carbide complex exhibiting polar covalent C-M bonding

=== Terminal carbido ligands ===
Metathesis using Grubbs-type alkylidene complexes can be used to synthesize terminal carbido-containing complexes. One example is RuC(PCy_{3})_{2}Cl_{2} with a Ru-C distance of 163 pm, typical for a triple bond. The complex can be obtained by metathesis of vinyl acetate to give [Ru(CH-p-C_{6}H_{4}Me)(PCy_{3})_{2}Cl_{2}] results in a metastable Ru(Cl_{2})(PCy_{3})_{2}C_{2}HOAc complex, which eliminates acetic acid.

The "naked" carbido ligand is weakly basic, forming complexes with other metal centers. The C-M bond is typically found to be around 1.65 Å. The ^{13}C NMR resonance values for the carbido carbons vary widely, but range from δ211-406. Another example of a terminal carbido complex is Li[MoC(NR2)3] (Mo-C distance of 172 pm), which forms upon deprotonation of the respective methylidyne precursor.

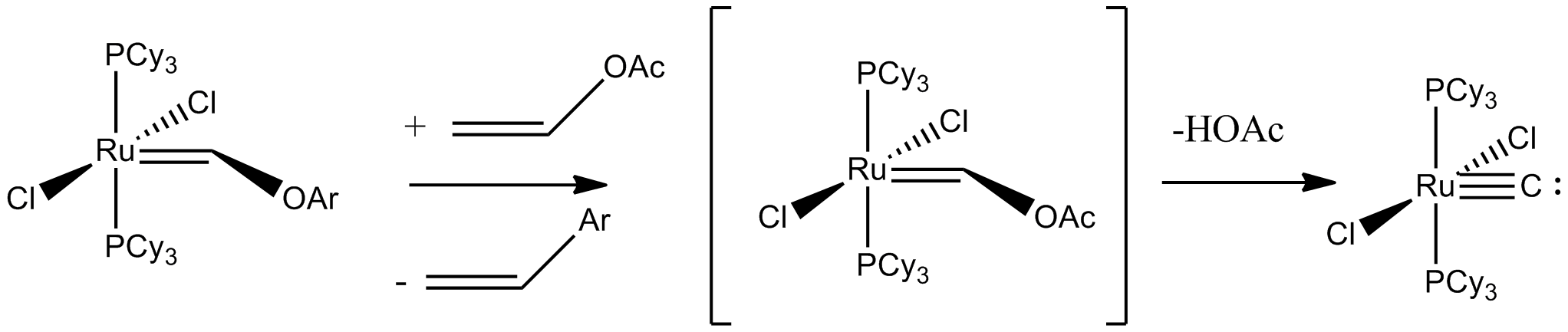
Synthesis of a terminal carbido complex.

== See also ==
- Metallocarbohedryne ("met-car"), a stable cluster with formula M_{8}C_{12} (M = Ti, Zr, V, etc.)
