= Servet A. Duran =

Servet A. Duran (1920–1996) was a Materials Science Professor at Washington State University (WSU) in Pullman, Washington, from the mid-1950s to the early 1980s.

== Biography ==
Duran was born on 2 January 1920, in what was then the Ottoman Empire, and moved to the United States in 1939. He attended Missouri School of Mines and Metallurgy and Stanford University. After graduation, in 1947, he became a metallurgy/materials science professor at Washington State University. From 1956 to 1958, he was a visiting professor at Stanford University, and in 1969, he was a visiting professor and consultant to Middle East Technical Institute in Ankara, Turkey.

He used a textbook he wrote called Introduction to Materials Science, Copyright S. A. Duran, 1971, Revised 1980. There is a scholarship in his name at WSU. He died on 23 July 1996 from complications of pneumonia. He was 76.
