= Boonmark Sirinaovakul =

Boonmark Sirinaovakul (Thai: บุญมาก ศิริเนาวกุล, RTGS: Bunmak Sirinaowakun; born 19 August 1955) is a Thai academic and politician. He is an associate professor at Stamford International University, where he formerly served as president, and an executive member of the Democrat Party. He served two terms (1995–1996 and 1996–2000) as a member of the House of Representatives, representing Ratchaburi Province.

Since 1979, Boonmark has written fifteen publications and co-authored an additional eight. His work has been published in the United Kingdom, the United States, and Thailand. He has also presented papers at international conferences and summits in France and Switzerland.

== Early life ==
Boonmark was born on August 19, 1955. He is the son of Somsak Sirinaovakul. He has one brother, named Booncharoen.

He is married to Kanlaya Sirinaovakul and has a daughter named Boonyakorn.

== Education ==
Boonmark received a bachelor's degree from King Mongkut's Institute of Technology in 1978 and a master's degree from Chulalongkorn University in 1981, both in Electrical Engineering. From there, he proceeded to the United States and, in 1983, earned an M.S. in Engineering Management from the University of Missouri at Rolla. In 1987 he finished his formal education with a Ph.D. in Industrial Engineering from Wichita State University, Kansas and was awarded an Engineer-in-Training Certificate by the State of Kansas. From 1983 to 1987, he was the recipient of Doctoral Fellowship Awards from Wichita State University.

Boonmark has attended a training program at the PSB Corp. in Singapore for chief executive officers and additional programs at the Friedrich Naumann Foundation in Bonn, Germany (Political Strategies, Political Economy, Rules of Law) and at the Andersen Consulting School in Chicago, Illinois in the United States (METHOD/1, Programming Foundations, System Analysis and Design, Client Service).

== Career ==
During his academic career, Boonmark was founding dean of the Graduate School of Computer and Engineering Management at Assumption University, Bangkok. He has served as an advisory board member, council member, and assistant president at several universities in Thailand. He also held the following posts:

- Provost of Cyber University (Rangsit University)
- Provost of Dhurakij Pundit University
- Dean of Graduate School (Assumption University - ABAC)

He has been a visiting professor at the University of Missouri in Rolla, USA. His non-academic experience includes business consultant and managing director.

Since 1996, Boonmark has been a weekly writer for Dailynews and a D.J. for radio programs at FM99.25, FM107.5, AM1287 and AM1593.

== Research ==
Boonmark has conducted extensive scientific researches. His works include:

- Manufacturing Execution System for Chemical Industry
- Six Sigma Process Implementation for Electronic Industry
- Learning Potential for Thai Manufacturing Industry
- Innovation Diffusion Process and Regional Policies for Thailand
- Strategic Information Technology Plan for Thai Banking Business
- A Mathematical Model for Spatial Innovation Diffusion : A Case of Robotics in USA
- NP Junction Solar Cell Simulation
