= Dan Obrycki =

Dan Obrycki is the co-founder of The Applied Finance Group. Obrycki and Rafael Resendes together created Economic Margin (EM), AFG's proprietary framework, to evaluate corporate performance from an economic cash flow perspective. Obrycki is the head of AFG's main office in Chicago.

== Education ==
Obrycki graduated summa cum laude from the University of Missouri-Rolla with a BS in Geological Engineering and obtained his MBA with a finance specialization from the University of Chicago. Obrycki has also been an adjunct professor of finance at DePaul University in Chicago, Illinois.

== Other ventures ==
Prior to co-founding AFG, Obrycki was the Manager of Research for a portfolio consulting firm, HOLT Value Associates. In addition, he worked as a Senior Economic Analyst for Amoco Production Company in their domestic and international business units. There he provided extensive economic analyses and valuations on numerous investment opportunities, acquisitions, divestitures, funding arrangements, and tax and foreign exchange issues.
