= The Applied Finance Group =

- Type: Private
- Industry: Financial services
- Founded: 1995; 31 years ago
- Headquarters: Chicago, Illinois, United States
- Area served: Worldwide
- Key people: Rafael Resendes (Co-Founder), Dan Obrycki (Co-Founder)
- Services: Securities research
- Website: www.economicmargin.com

The Applied Finance Group (AFG) is an American institutional equity research firm founded in 1995 by Rafael Resendes and Dan Obrycki.

== History ==
In 1995 Rafael Resendes and Daniel Obrycki founded the Applied Finance Group in Chicago, Illinois as an independent research company. AFG sought to build a more sophisticated Value Based Metric to measure a company's true economic profit. With that goal in mind, AFG developed its proprietary framework, Economic Margin (EM), to evaluate corporate performance from an economic cash flow perspective. In 2001, Morningstar, Inc. adopted AFG's Methodology to launch the Morningstar Rating for stocks. AFG expanded to its second office in Fresno, California in 2003. Resendes relocated to work as head of the Fresno Office, while Obrycki managed from Chicago.

In 2004, AFG created a large cap model portfolio of stocks called the AFG50. AFG created the AFG50 portfolio to provide Trust Departments and small RIAs a product that could serve as an outsource/research team. Later that year AFG partnered with Chief Executive Magazine and Drew Morris, CEO of "Great Numbers!", to launch the Chief Executive/Applied Finance Group Wealth Creation Rankings, a research instrument used to rank companies based on their value and ability to create value. In 2009 AFG began providing research internationally for the first time in the company's history.

== Founders ==
Applied Finance Group was co-founded Rafael Resendes and by Dan Obrycki.

=== Rafael Resendes ===
Resendes is the Managing Director for Toreador Research and Trading.

Prior to co-founding AFG, Resendes was a member of the Chicago Board of Trade and served as director of research for HOLT Value Associates. Rafael graduated Phi Beta Kappa from The University of California, Berkeley, with a Bachelor of Science in Finance and Economic Analysis and obtained an MBA from the University of Chicago.

Resendes has also contributed his insight to various news outlets such as CNBC, CNN, Fox News, RealClearPolitics.

=== Dan Obrycki ===
Prior to co-founding AFG, Obrycki was the manager of research for a portfolio consulting firm, HOLT Value Associates. Daniel graduated summa cum laude from the University of Missouri-Rolla with a BS in geological engineering and obtained his MBA with a finance specialization from the University of Chicago.

Obrycki has also served as an adjunct professor at DePaul University in Chicago.

== Value Expectations ==
AFG launched Value Expectations in 2008, a stock blog and investment newsletter. Value Expectations was created to serve as an outlet covering topics on corporate performance and equity valuation.
