= FastCAP =

FastCAP or FastCap may refer to:

- FastCAP, a type of combat air patrol to protect fighter strike aircraft
- FastCap®, a brand of supercapacitors from the company Nanoramic®
