= Capacitor types =

Manufacturing styles of an electronic device

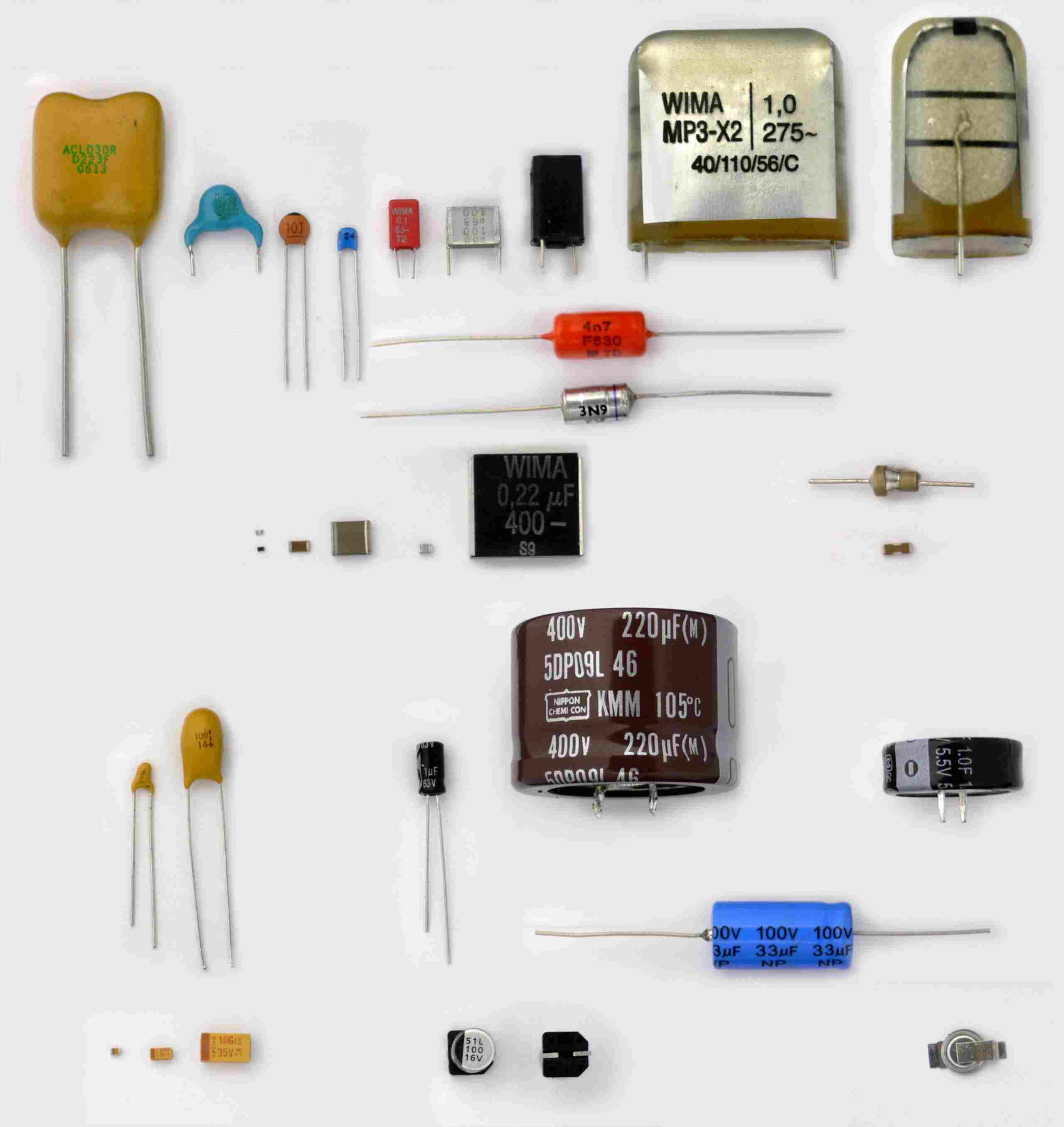
Some different capacitors for electronic equipment

Capacitors are manufactured in many styles, forms, dimensions, and from a large variety of materials. They all contain at least two electrical conductors, called plates, separated by an insulating layer (dielectric). Capacitors are widely used as parts of electrical circuits in many common electrical devices.

Capacitors, together with resistors and inductors, belong to the group of passive components in electronic equipment. Small capacitors are used in electronic devices to couple signals between stages of amplifiers, as components of electric filters and tuned circuits, or as parts of power supply systems to smooth rectified current. Larger capacitors are used for energy storage in such applications as strobe lights, as parts of some types of electric motors, or for power factor correction in AC power distribution systems. Standard capacitors have a fixed value of capacitance, but adjustable capacitors are frequently used in tuned circuits. Different types are used depending on required capacitance, working voltage, current handling capacity, and other properties.

While, in absolute figures, the most commonly manufactured capacitors are integrated into dynamic random-access memory, flash memory, and other device chips, this article covers the discrete components.

== General characteristics ==
=== Conventional construction ===
A dielectric material is placed between two conducting plates (electrodes), each of area A and with a separation of d.

A conventional capacitor stores electric energy as static electricity by charge separation in an electric field between two electrode plates. The charge carriers are typically electrons. The amount of charge stored per unit voltage is essentially a function of the size of the plates, the plate material's properties, the properties of the dielectric material placed between the plates, and the separation distance (i.e. dielectric thickness). The potential difference between the plates is limited by the properties of the dielectric material and the separation distance.

Nearly all conventional industrial capacitors except some special types such as "feed-through capacitors", are constructed as "plate capacitors" even if their electrodes and the dielectric between are wound or rolled. The capacitance C of a plate capacitor is

$$C= \frac{\varepsilon A}{d}$$.

The capacitance increases with the area A of the plates and with the permittivity ε of the dielectric material, and decreases with the plate separation distance d. The capacitance is therefore greatest in devices made from materials with a high permittivity, large plate area, and small distance between plates.

=== Electrochemical construction ===
Schematic of double layer capacitor.: 1. IHP Inner Helmholtz Layer; 2. OHP Outer Helmholtz Layer; 3. Diffuse layer; 4. Solvated ions; 5. Specifically adsorptive ions (Pseudocapacitance); 6. Solvent molecule

Another type – the electrochemical capacitor – makes use of two other storage principles to store electric energy. In contrast to ceramic, film, and electrolytic capacitors, supercapacitors (also known as electrical double-layer capacitors (EDLC) or ultracapacitors) do not have a conventional dielectric. The capacitance value of an electrochemical capacitor is determined by two high-capacity storage principles. These principles are:

- electrostatic storage within Helmholtz double layers achieved on the phase interface between the surface of the electrodes and the electrolyte (double-layer capacitance); and
- electrochemical storage achieved by a faradaic electron charge-transfer by specifically absorbed ions with redox reactions (pseudocapacitance). Unlike batteries, in these reactions, the ions simply cling to the atomic structure of an electrode without making or breaking chemical bonds, and no or negligibly small chemical modifications are involved in charge/discharge.

The ratio of the storage resulting from each principle can vary greatly, depending on electrode design and electrolyte composition. Pseudocapacitance can increase the capacitance value by as much as an order of magnitude over that of the double-layer by itself.

=== Classification ===
Capacitors are divided into two mechanical groups: Fixed-capacitance devices with a constant capacitance and variable capacitors. Variable capacitors are made as trimmers, that are either adjusted only during circuit calibration, or a device tunable during operation of the electronic instrument.

The most common group is the fixed capacitors. Many are named based on the type of dielectric. For a systematic classification these characteristics cannot be used, because one of the oldest, the electrolytic capacitor, is named instead by its cathode construction. So the most-used names are simply historical.

The most common kinds of capacitors are:

- Ceramic capacitors have a ceramic dielectric.
- Film and paper capacitors are named for their dielectrics.
- Aluminum, tantalum and niobium electrolytic capacitors are named after the material used as the anode and the construction of the cathode (electrolyte).
- Polymer capacitors are aluminum, tantalum or niobium electrolytic capacitors with conductive polymer as electrolyte.
- Supercapacitor is the family name for:
  - Double-layer capacitors were named for the physical phenomenon of the Helmholtz double-layer.
  - Pseudocapacitors were named for their ability to store electric energy electro-chemically with reversible faradaic charge-transfer.
  - Hybrid capacitors combine double-layer and pseudocapacitors to increase power density.
- Silver mica, glass, silicon, air-gap and vacuum capacitors are named for their dielectric.

Overview over the most commonly used fixed capacitors in electronic equipment

In addition to the above shown capacitor types, which derived their name from historical development, there are many individual capacitors that have been named based on their application. They include:

- Power capacitors, motor capacitors, DC-link capacitors, suppression capacitors, audio crossover capacitors, lighting ballast capacitors, snubber capacitors, coupling, decoupling or bypassing capacitors.

Often, more than one capacitor family is employed for these applications, e.g. interference suppression can use ceramic capacitors or film capacitors.

Other kinds of capacitors are discussed in the #Special capacitors section.

=== Dielectrics ===
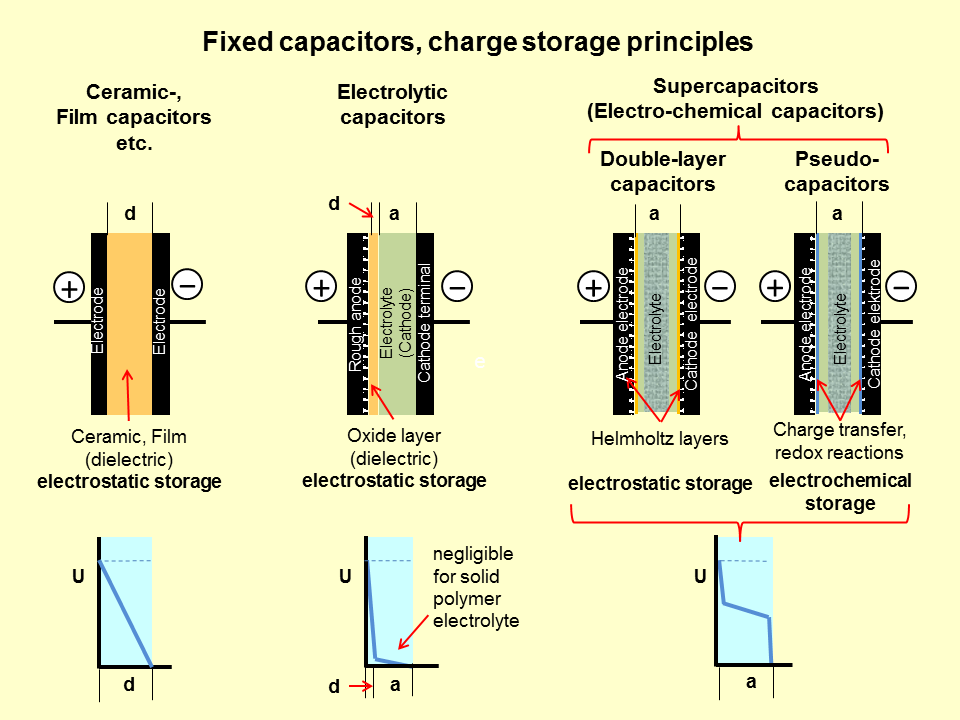
Charge storage principles of different capacitor types and their inherent voltage progression

The most common dielectrics are:

- Ceramics
- Plastic films
- Oxide layer on metal (aluminum, tantalum, niobium)
- Natural materials like mica, glass, paper, air, SF_{6}, vacuum

All of them store their electrical charge statically within an electric field between two (parallel) electrodes.

Beneath these conventional capacitors a family of electrochemical capacitors called supercapacitors was developed. Supercapacitors do not have a conventional dielectric. They store their electrical charge statically in Helmholtz double-layers and faradaically at the surface of electrodes

- with static double-layer capacitance in a double-layer capacitor and
- with pseudocapacitance (faradaic charge transfer) in a pseudocapacitor
- or with both storage principles together in hybrid capacitors.

The most important material parameters of the different dielectrics used and the approximate Helmholtz-layer thickness are given in the table below.

Key parameters
Capacitor style	Dielectric	Relative Permittivity at 1 kHz	Maximum/realized dielectric strength (Volt/μm)	Minimum thickness of the dielectric (μm)
Ceramic capacitors, Class 1	paraelectric	12 to 40	< 100 (?)	1
Ceramic capacitors, Class 2	ferroelectric	200 to 14,000	< 35	0.5
Film capacitors	Polypropylene ( PP)	2.2	650 / 450	1.9 to 3.0
Film capacitors	Polyethylene terephthalate, Polyester (PET)	3.3	580 / 280	0.7 to 0.9
Film capacitors	Polyphenylene sulfide (PPS)	3.0	470 / 220	1.2
Film capacitors	Polyethylene naphthalate (PEN)	3.0	500 / 300	0.9 to 1.4
Film capacitors	Polytetrafluoroethylene (PTFE)	2.0	450 (?) / 250	5.5
Paper capacitors	Paper	3.5 to 5.5	60	5 to 10
Aluminum electrolytic capacitors	Aluminium oxide Al_{2}O_{3}	9.6	710	< 0.01 (6.3 V) < 0.8 (450 V)
Tantalum electrolytic capacitors	Tantalum pentoxide Ta_{2}O_{5}	26	625	< 0.01 (6.3 V) < 0.08 (40 V)
Niobium electrolytic capacitors	Niobium pentoxide, Nb_{2}O_{5}	42	455	< 0.01 (6.3 V) < 0.10 (40 V)
Supercapacitors; Double-layer capacitors	Helmholtz double-layer	–	5000	< 0.001 (2.7 V)
Vacuum capacitors	Vacuum	1	40	–
Air gap capacitors	Air	1	3.3	–
Glass capacitors	Glass	5 to 10	450	–
Mica capacitors	Mica	5 to 8	118	4 to 50

The capacitor's plate area can be adapted to the wanted capacitance value. The permittivity and the dielectric thickness are the determining parameters for capacitors. Ease of processing is also crucial. Thin, mechanically flexible sheets can be wrapped or stacked easily, yielding large designs with high capacitance values. Razor-thin metallized sintered ceramic layers covered with metallized electrodes however, offer the best conditions for the miniaturization of circuits with SMD styles.

The figures in the table above gives the explanation for some simple facts:

- Supercapacitors have the highest capacitance density because of their special charge storage principles.
- Electrolytic capacitors have lesser capacitance density than supercapacitors but the highest capacitance density of conventional capacitors due to the thin dielectric.
- Ceramic capacitors class 2 have higher capacitance values in a given case than class 1 capacitors because of their higher permittivity.
- Film capacitors with their different plastic film material have a small spread in the dimensions for a given capacitance/voltage value of a film capacitor because the minimum dielectric film thickness differs between the different film materials.

Capacitance ranges vs. voltage ranges of different capacitor types

=== Capacitance and voltage range ===
Capacitance ranges from picofarads to more than hundreds of farads. Voltage ratings can reach 100 kilovolts. In general, capacitance and voltage correlate with physical size and cost.

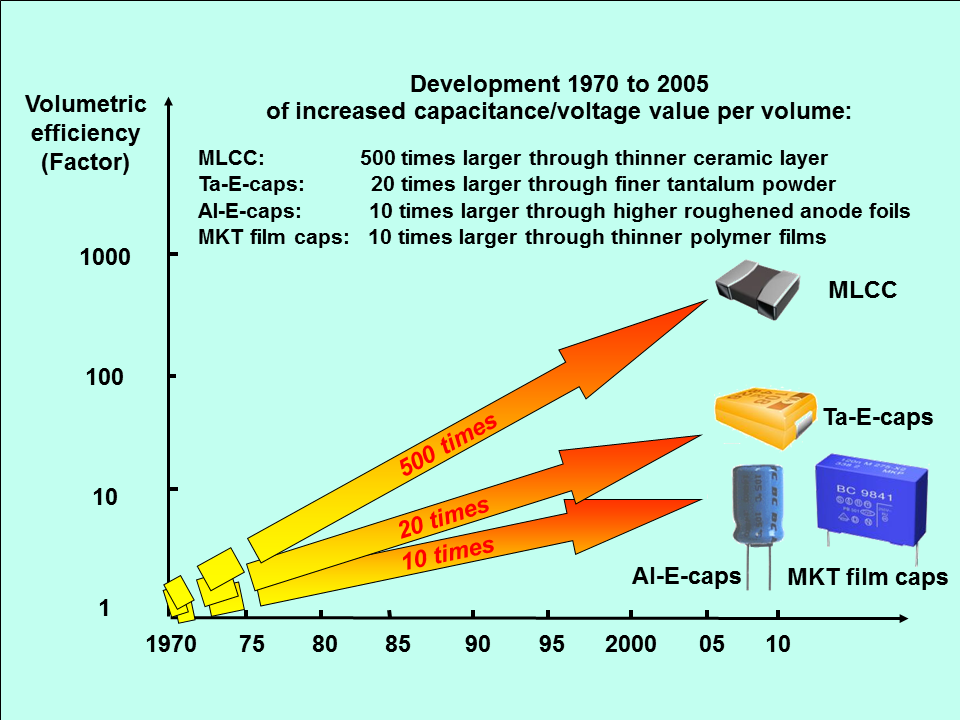
Capacitor volumetric efficiency increased from 1970 to 2005 (click image to enlarge)

=== Miniaturization ===
As in other areas of electronics, volumetric efficiency measures the performance of electronic function per unit volume. For capacitors, the volumetric efficiency is measured with the "CV product", calculated by multiplying the capacitance (C) by the maximum voltage rating (V), divided by the volume. From 1970 to 2005, volumetric efficiencies improved dramatically.

Miniaturizing of capacitors

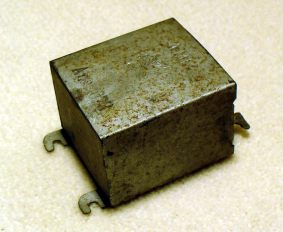
Stacked paper capacitor from 1923 for noise decoupling (blocking) in telegraph lines

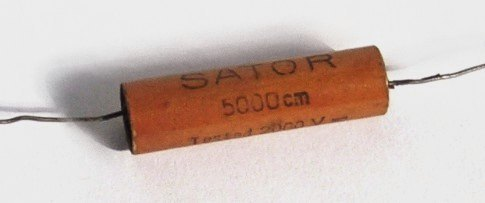
Wound metallized paper capacitor from the early 1930s in hardpaper case, capacitance value specified in "cm" in the cgs system; 5,000 cm corresponds to 0.0056 μF.

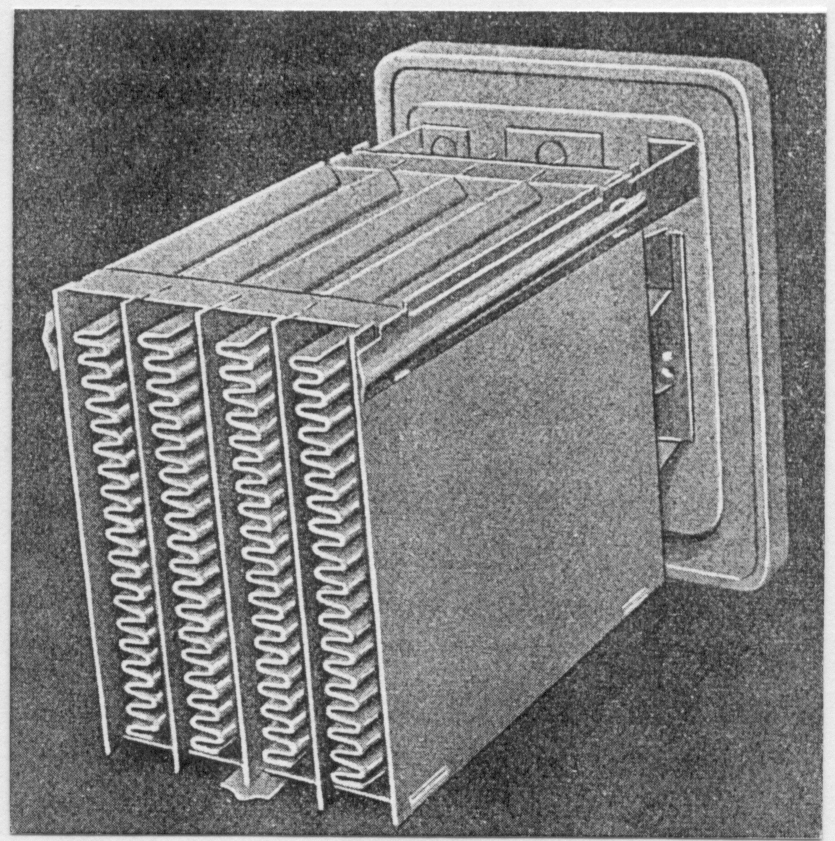
Folded wet aluminum electrolytic capacitor, Bell System 1929, view onto the folded anode, which was mounted in a squared housing (not shown) filled with liquid electrolyte

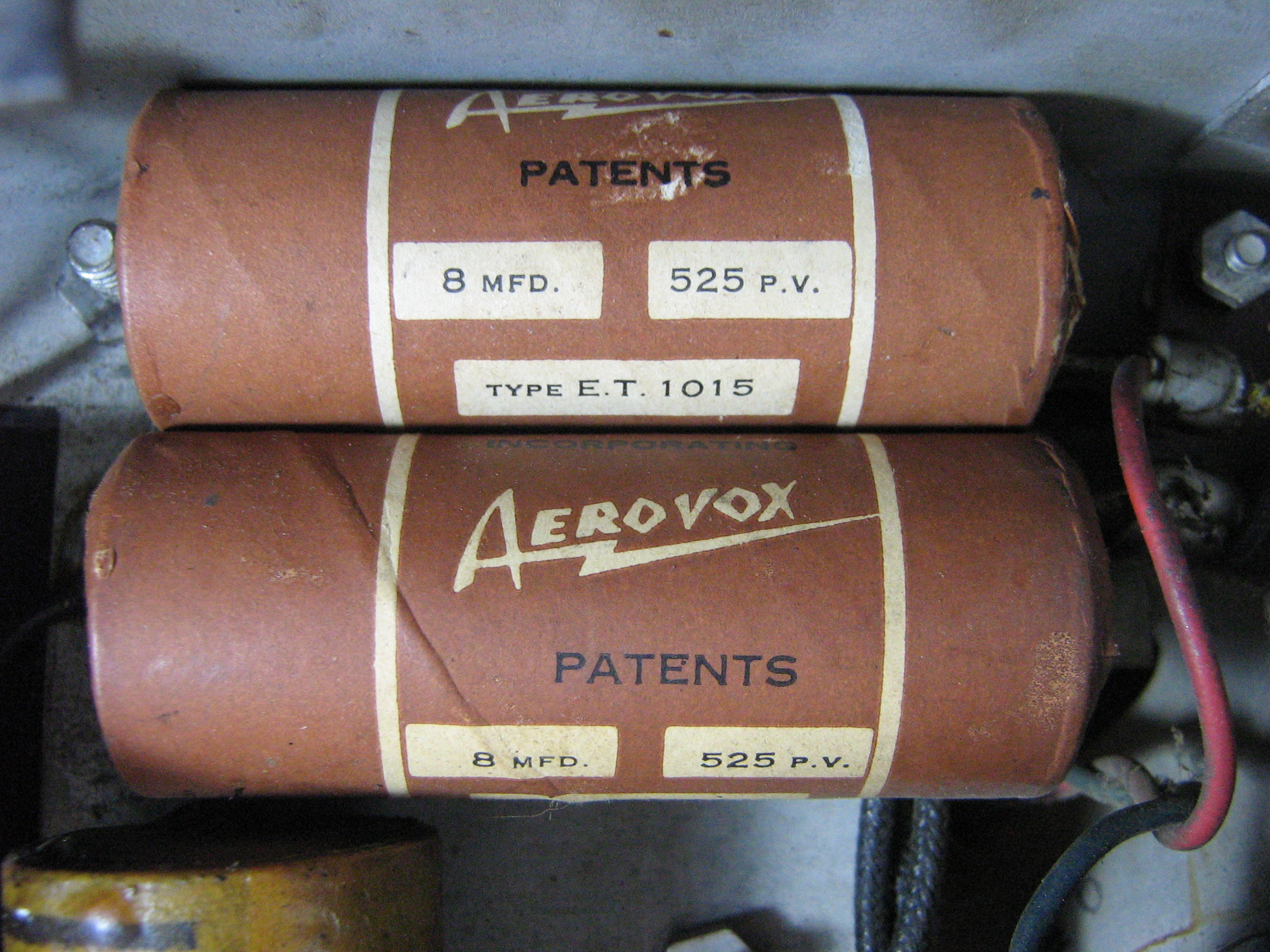
Two 8 μF, 525 V wound wet aluminum electrolytic capacitors in paper housing sealed with tar out of a 1930s radio.

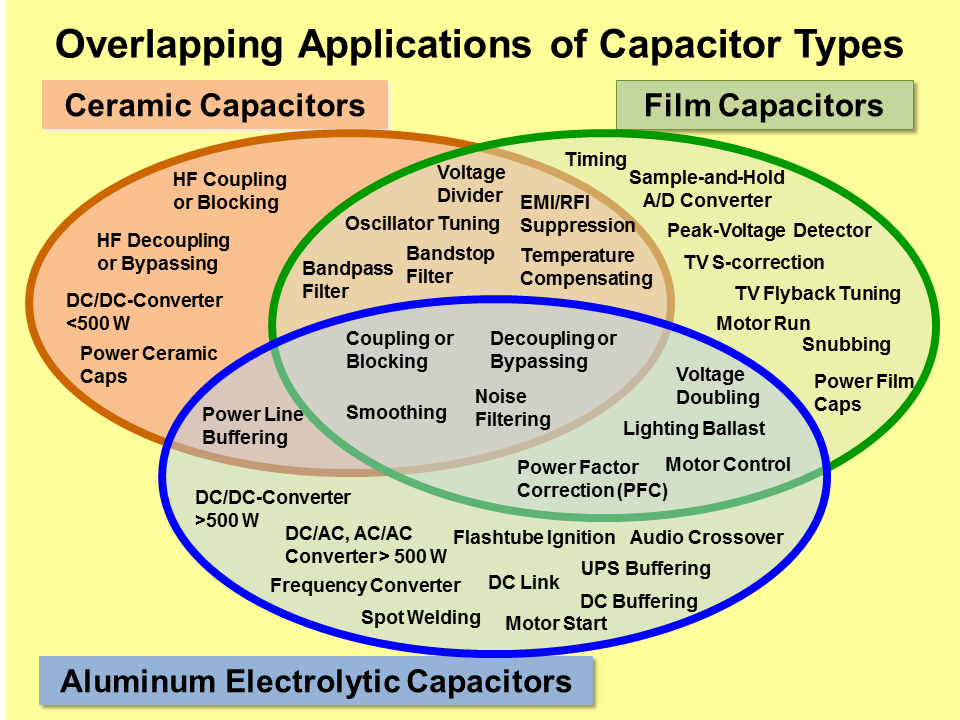
Comparing the three main capacitor types it shows, that a broad range of overlapping functions for many general-purpose and industrial applications exists in electronic equipment.

=== Overlapping range of the applications ===
These individual capacitors can perform their application independent of their affiliation to an above shown capacitor type, so that an overlapping range of applications between the different capacitor types exists.

== Types and styles ==
=== Ceramic capacitors ===
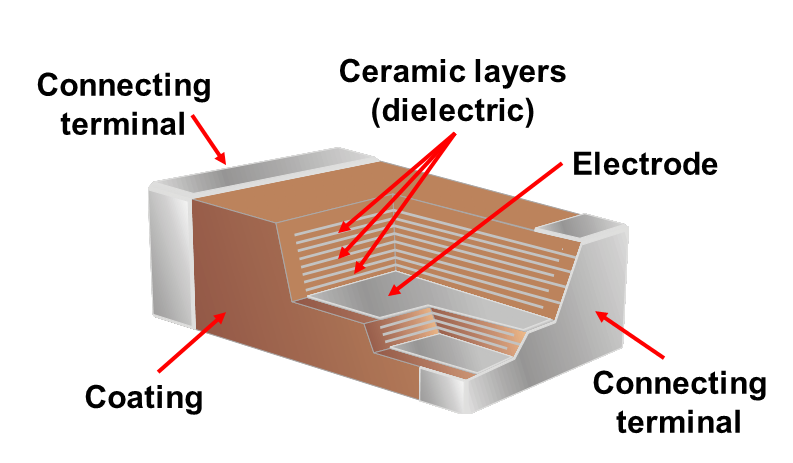
Construction of a Multi-Layer Ceramic Capacitor (MLCC)

A ceramic capacitor is a non-polarized fixed capacitor made out of two or more alternating layers of ceramic and metal in which the ceramic material acts as the dielectric and the metal acts as the electrodes. The ceramic material is a mixture of finely ground granules of paraelectric or ferroelectric materials, modified by mixed oxides that are necessary to achieve the capacitor's desired characteristics. The electrical behavior of the ceramic material is divided into two stability classes:

1. Class 1 ceramic capacitors with high stability and low losses compensating the influence of temperature in resonant circuit application. Common EIA/IEC code abbreviations are C0G/NP0, P2G/N150, R2G/N220, U2J/N750 etc.
2. Class 2 ceramic capacitors with high volumetric efficiency for buffer, by-pass and coupling applications Common EIA/IEC code abbreviations are: X7R/2XI, Z5U/E26, Y5V/2F4, X7S/2C1, etc.

The plasticity of ceramic raw material works well for many special applications and enables a diversity of styles, shapes and dimensional spread of ceramic capacitors. The smallest discrete capacitor, for instance, is a "01005" chip capacitor with the dimension of only 0.4 mm × 0.2 mm.

The construction of ceramic multilayer capacitors with mostly alternating layers results in single capacitors connected in parallel. This configuration increases capacitance and decreases losses and parasitic inductances. Ceramic capacitors are well-suited for high frequencies and high current pulse loads.

Because the thickness of the ceramic dielectric layer can be easily controlled and produced by the desired application voltage, ceramic capacitors are available with rated voltages up to the 30 kV range.

Some ceramic capacitors of special shapes and styles are used as capacitors for special applications, including RFI/EMI suppression capacitors for connection to supply mains, also known as safety capacitors, X2Y and three-terminal capacitors for bypassing and decoupling applications, feed-through capacitors for noise suppression by low-pass filters and ceramic power capacitors for transmitters and HF applications.

Diverse styles of ceramic capacitors

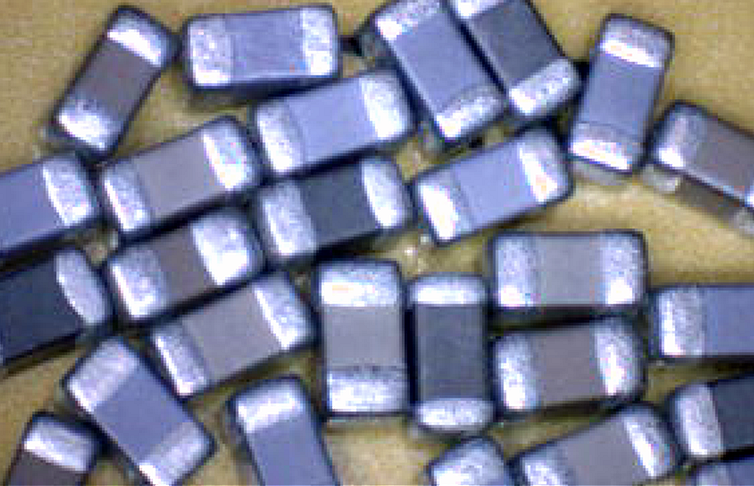
Multi-layer ceramic capacitors (MLCC chips) for SMD mounting

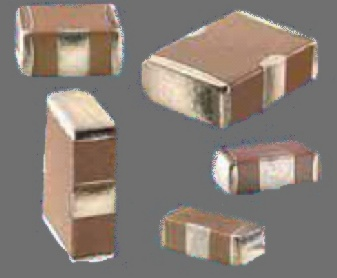
Ceramic X2Y decoupling capacitors

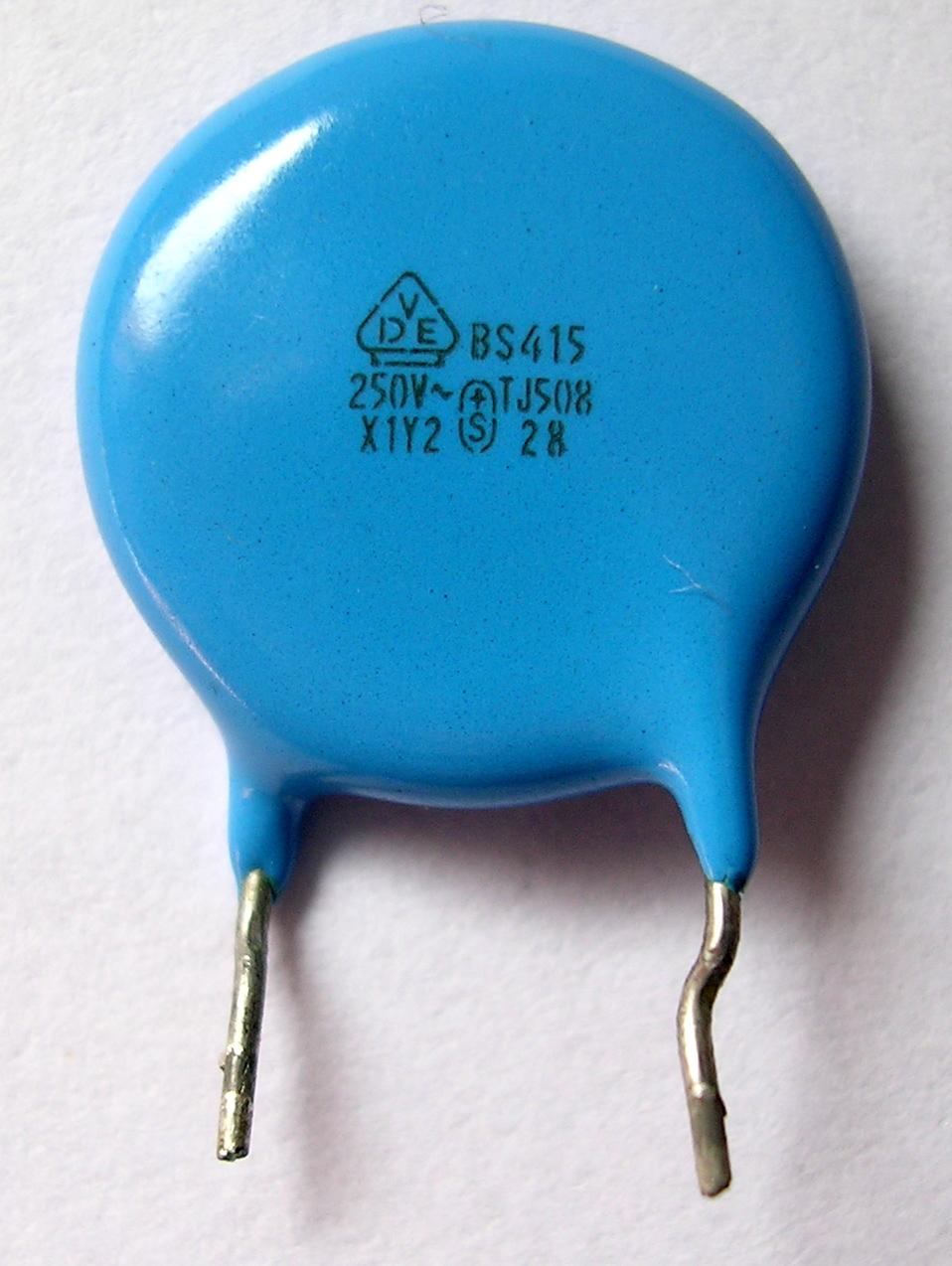
Ceramic EMI suppression capacitors for connection to the supply mains (safety capacitor)

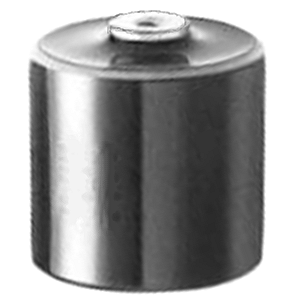
High voltage ceramic power capacitor

=== Film capacitors ===
Three examples of different film capacitor configurations for increasing surge current ratings

Film capacitors or plastic film capacitors are non-polarized capacitors with an insulating plastic film as the dielectric. The dielectric films are drawn to a thin layer, provided with metallic electrodes and wound into a cylindrical winding. The electrodes of film capacitors may be metallized aluminum or zinc, applied on one or both sides of the plastic film, resulting in metallized film capacitors or a separate metallic foil overlying the film, called film/foil capacitors.

Metallized film capacitors offer self-healing properties. Dielectric breakdowns or shorts between the electrodes do not destroy the component. The metallized construction makes it possible to produce wound capacitors with larger capacitance values (up to 100 μF and larger) in smaller cases than within film/foil construction.

Film/foil capacitors or metal foil capacitors use two plastic films as the dielectric. Each film is covered with a thin metal foil, mostly aluminium, to form the electrodes. The advantage of this construction is the ease of connecting the metal foil electrodes, along with an excellent current pulse strength.

A key advantage of every film capacitor's internal construction is direct contact to the electrodes on both ends of the winding. This contact keeps all current paths short. The design behaves like a large number of individual capacitors connected in parallel, thus reducing the internal ohmic losses (equivalent series resistance or ESR) and equivalent series inductance (ESL). The inherent geometry of film capacitor structure results in low ohmic losses and a low parasitic inductance, which makes them suitable for applications with high surge currents (snubbers) and for AC power applications or for applications at higher frequencies.

The plastic films used as the dielectric for film capacitors are polypropylene (PP), polyester (PET), polyphenylene sulfide (PPS), polyethylene naphthalate (PEN), and polytetrafluoroethylene (PTFE). Polypropylene has a market share of about 50% and polyester with about 40% are the most used film materials. The other 10% use the other materials, including PPS and paper, with roughly 3% each.

Characteristics of plastic film materials for film capacitors
		Film material, abbreviated codes			
Film characteristics		PET	PEN	PPS	PP
Relative permittivity at 1 kHz		3.3	3.0	3.0	2.2
Minimum film thickness (μm)		0.7–0.9	0.9–1.4	1.2	2.4–3.0
Moisture absorption (%)		low	0.4	0.05	<0.1
Dielectric strength (V/μm)		580	500	470	650
Commercial realized voltage proof (V/μm)		280	300	220	400
DC voltage range (V)		50–1,000	16–250	16–100	40–2,000
Capacitance range		100 pF–22 μF	100 pF–1 μF	100 pF–0.47 μF	100 pF–10 μF
Application temperature range (°C)		−55 to +125 /+150	−55 to +150	−55 to +150	−55 to +105
C/C_{0} versus temperature range (%)		±5	±5	±1.5	±2.5
Dissipation factor (•10^{−4})					
Dissipation factor (•10^{−4})	at 1 kHz	50–200	42–80	2–15	0.5–5
Dissipation factor (•10^{−4})	at 10 kHz	110–150	54–150	2.5–25	2–8
Dissipation factor (•10^{−4})	at 100 kHz	170–300	120–300	12–60	2–25
Dissipation factor (•10^{−4})	at 1 MHz	200–350	–	18–70	4–40
Time constant R_{Insul}•C (s)	at 25 °C	≥10,000	≥10,000	≥10,000	≥100,000
Time constant R_{Insul}•C (s)	at 85 °C	1,000	1,000	1,000	10,000
Dielectric absorption (%)		0.2–0.5	1–1.2	0.05–0.1	0.01–0.1
Specific capacitance (nF•V/mm^{3})		400	250	140	50

Some film capacitors of special shapes and styles are used as capacitors for special applications, including RFI/EMI suppression capacitors for connection to the supply mains, also known as safety capacitors, snubber capacitors for very high surge currents, motor run capacitors and AC capacitors for motor-run applications.

High pulse current load is the most important feature of film capacitors so many of the available styles have special terminations for high currents

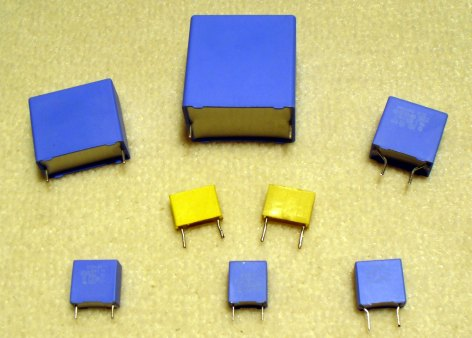
Radial style (single ended) for through-hole solder mounting on printed circuit boards

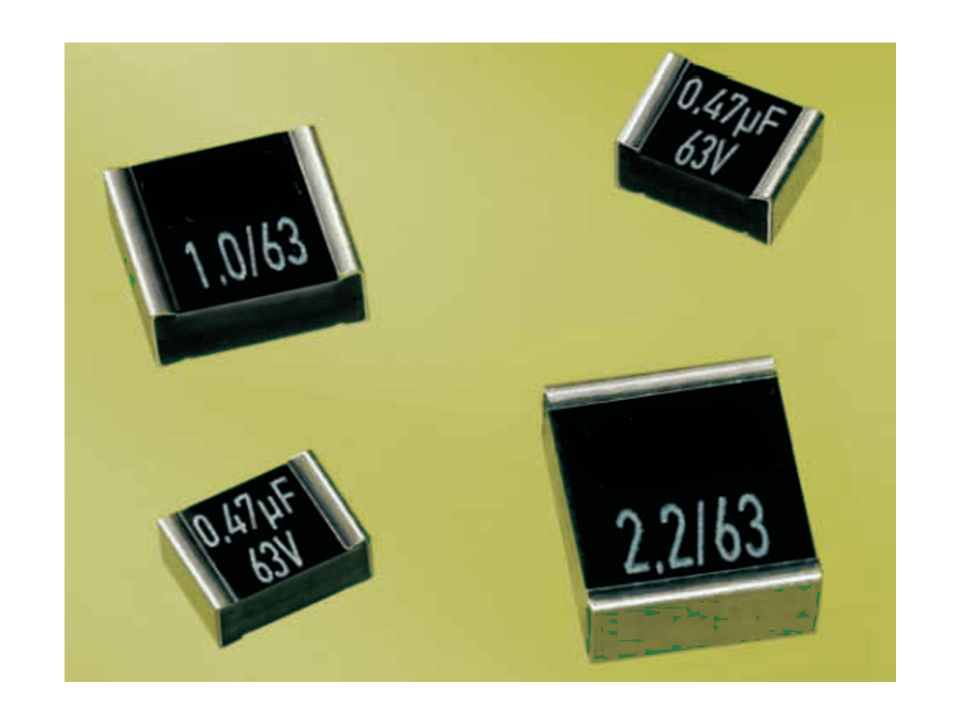
SMD style for printed circuit board surface mounting, with metallized contacts on two opposite edges

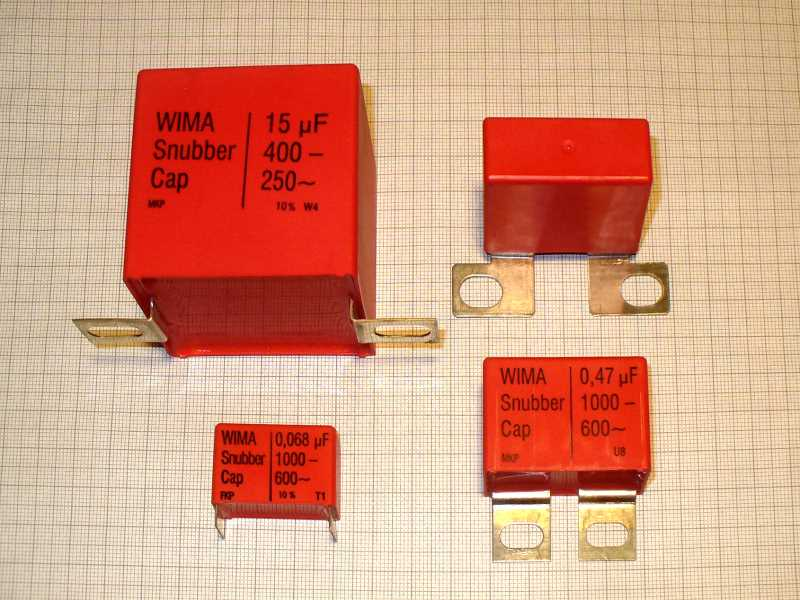
Radial style with heavy-duty solder terminals for snubber applications and high surge pulse loads

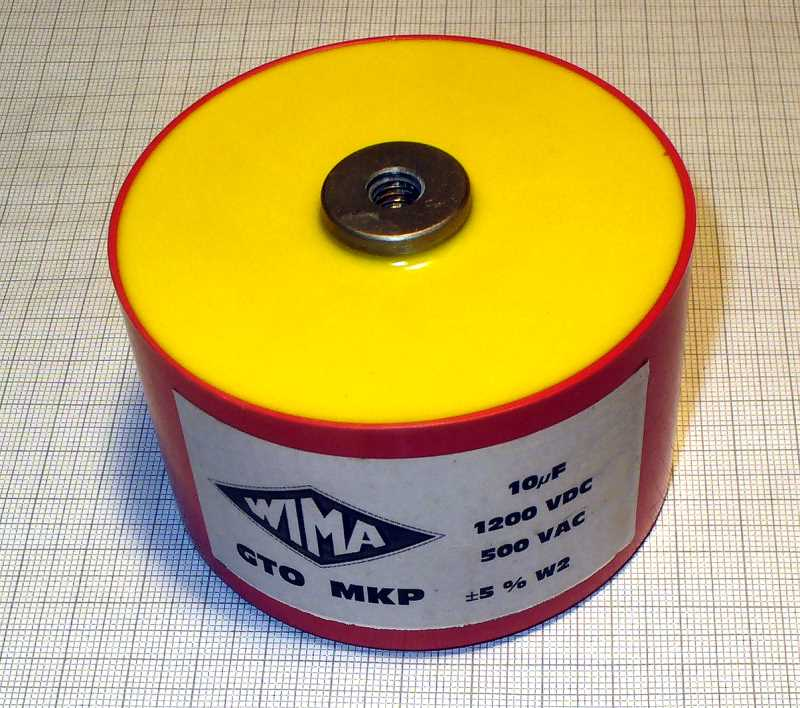
Heavy-duty snubber capacitor with screw terminals

=== Power film capacitors ===
MKV power capacitor, double-sided metallized paper (field-free mechanical carrier of the electrodes), polypropylene film (dielectric), windings impregnated with insulating oil

A related type is the power film capacitor. The materials and construction techniques used for large power film capacitors mostly are similar to those of ordinary film capacitors. However, capacitors with high to very high power ratings for applications in power systems and electrical installations are often classified separately, for historical reasons. The standardization of ordinary film capacitors is oriented on electrical and mechanical parameters. The standardization of power capacitors by contrast emphasizes the safety of personnel and equipment, as given by the local regulating authority.

As modern electronic equipment gained the capacity to handle power levels that were previously the exclusive domain of "electrical power" components, the distinction between the "electronic" and "electrical" power ratings blurred. Historically, the boundary between these two families was approximately at a reactive power of 200 volt-amperes.

Film power capacitors mostly use polypropylene film as the dielectric. Other types include metallized paper capacitors (MP capacitors) and mixed dielectric film capacitors with polypropylene dielectrics. MP capacitors serve for cost applications and as field-free carrier electrodes (soggy foil capacitors) for high AC or high current pulse loads. Windings can be filled with an insulating oil or with epoxy resin to reduce air bubbles, thereby preventing short circuits.

They find use as converters to change voltage, current or frequency, to store or deliver abruptly electric energy or to improve the power factor. The rated voltage range of these capacitors is from approximately 120 V AC (capacitive lighting ballasts) to 100 kV.

Power film capacitors for applications in power systems, electrical installations and plants

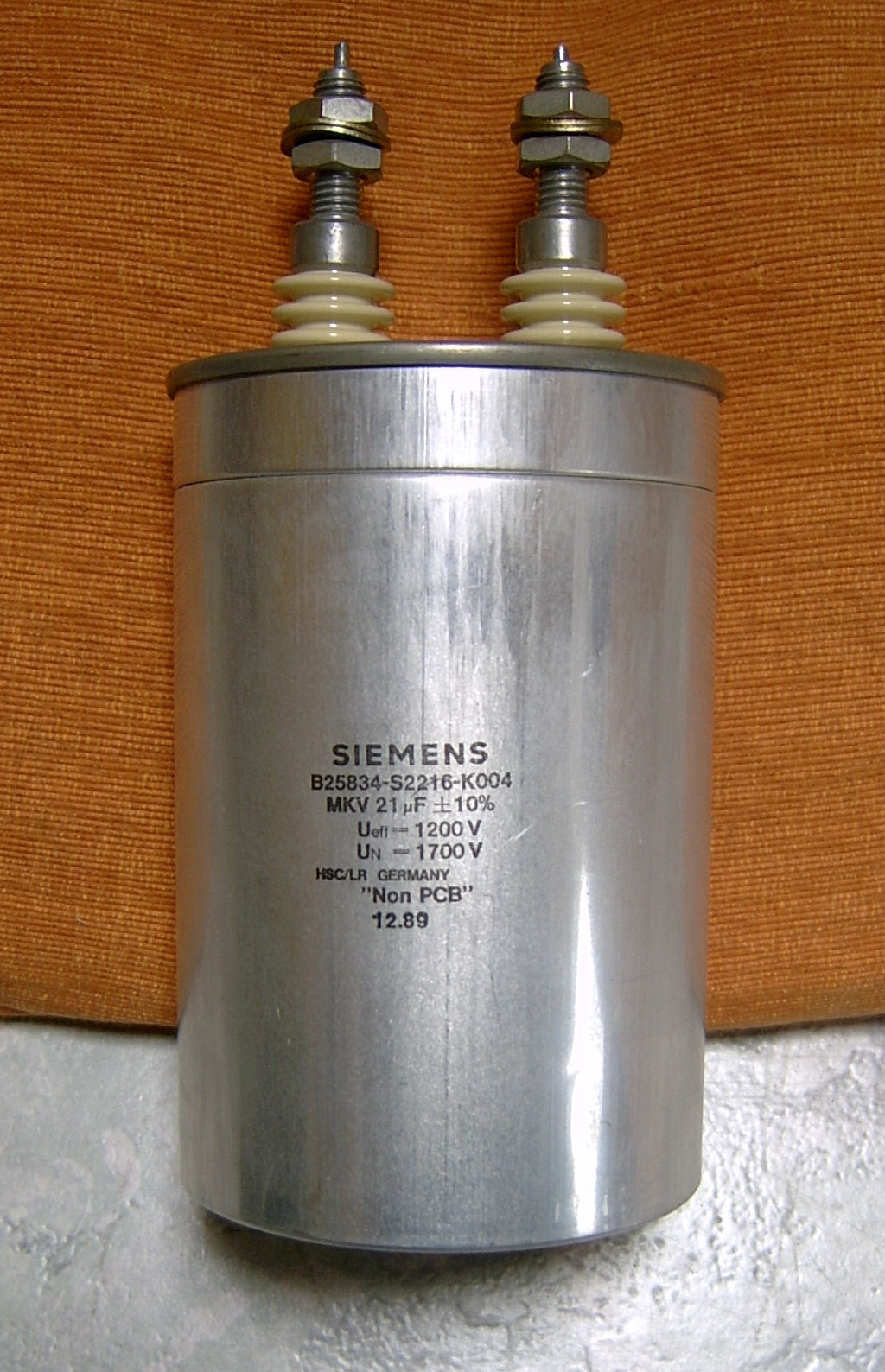
Power film capacitor for AC power-factor correction (PFC), packaged in a cylindrical metal can

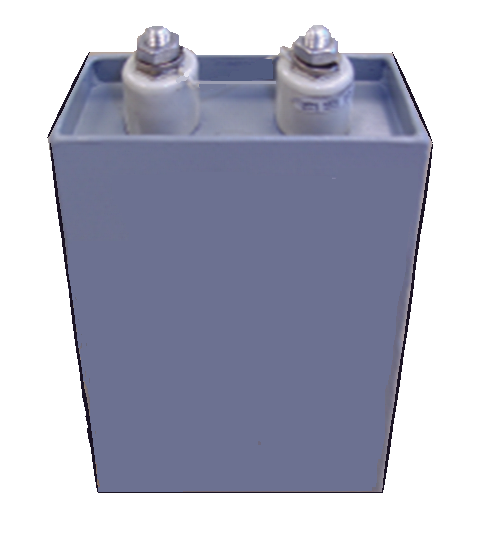
Power film capacitor in rectangular housing

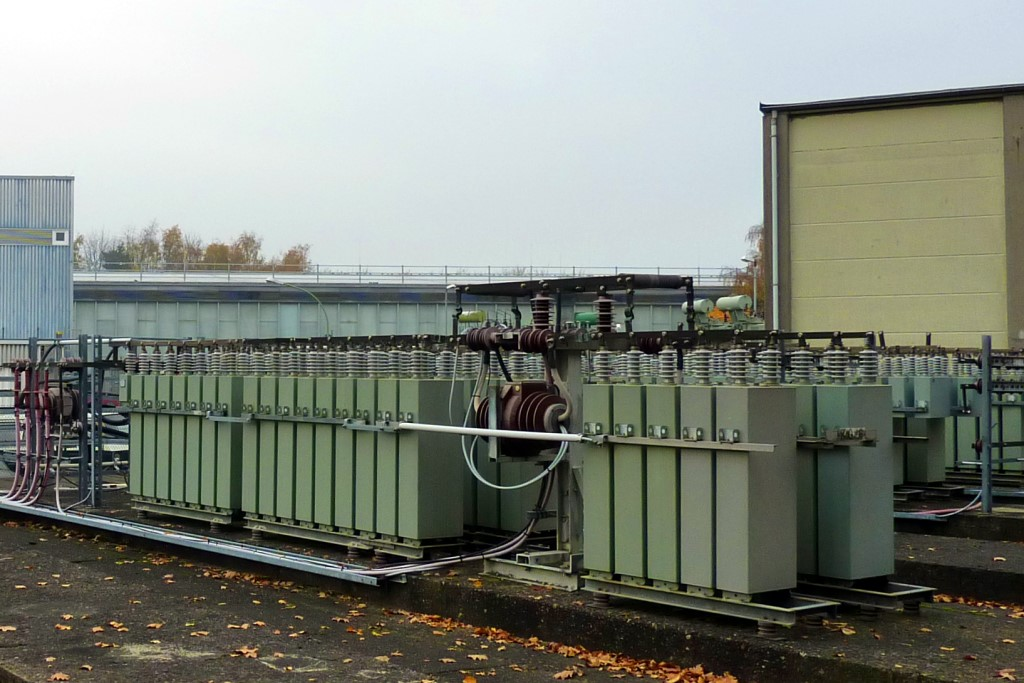
One of several energy storage power film capacitor banks, for magnetic field generation at the Hadron-Electron Ring Accelerator (HERA), located on the DESY site in Hamburg, Germany

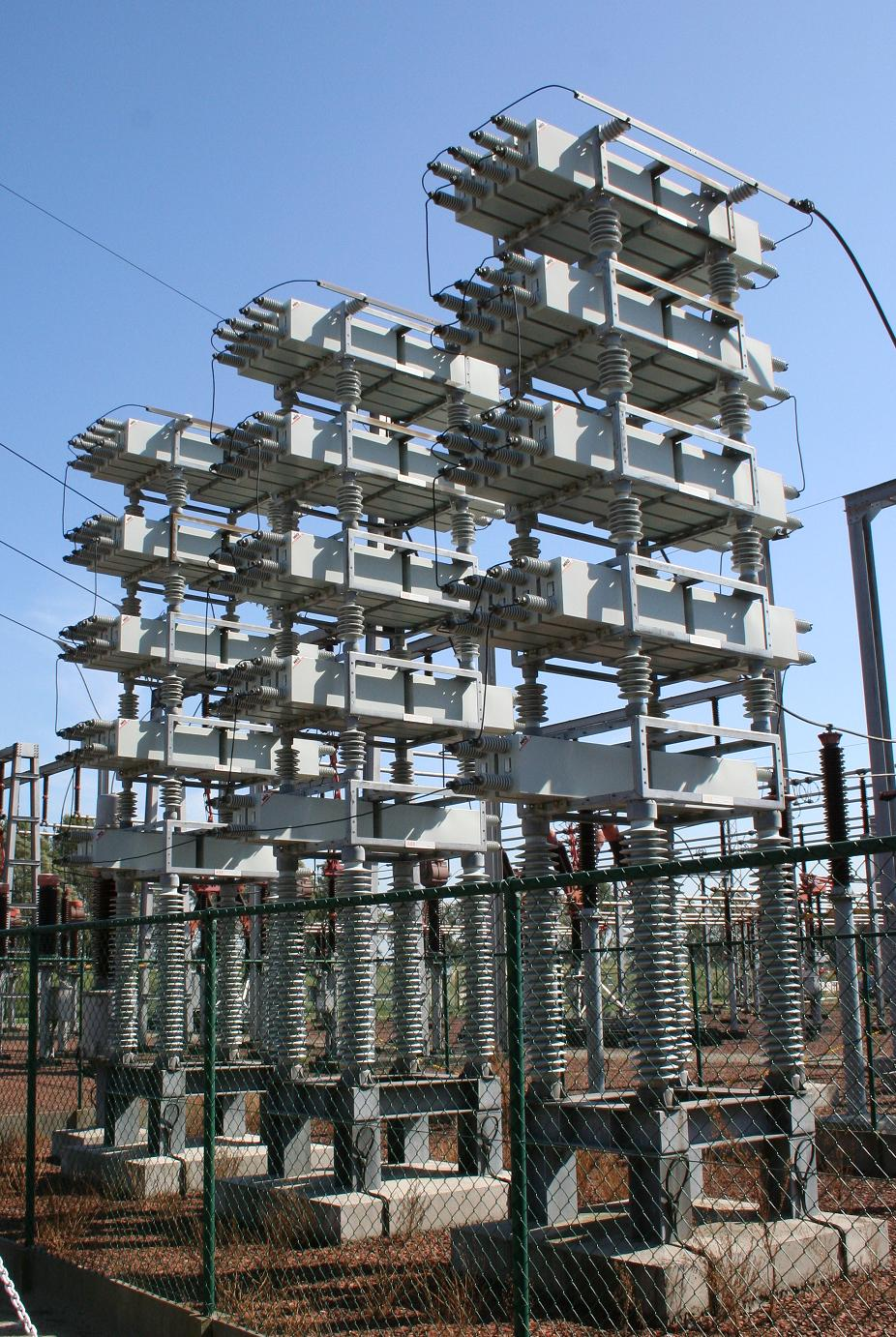
75MVAR substation capacitor bank at 150 kV

=== Electrolytic capacitors ===
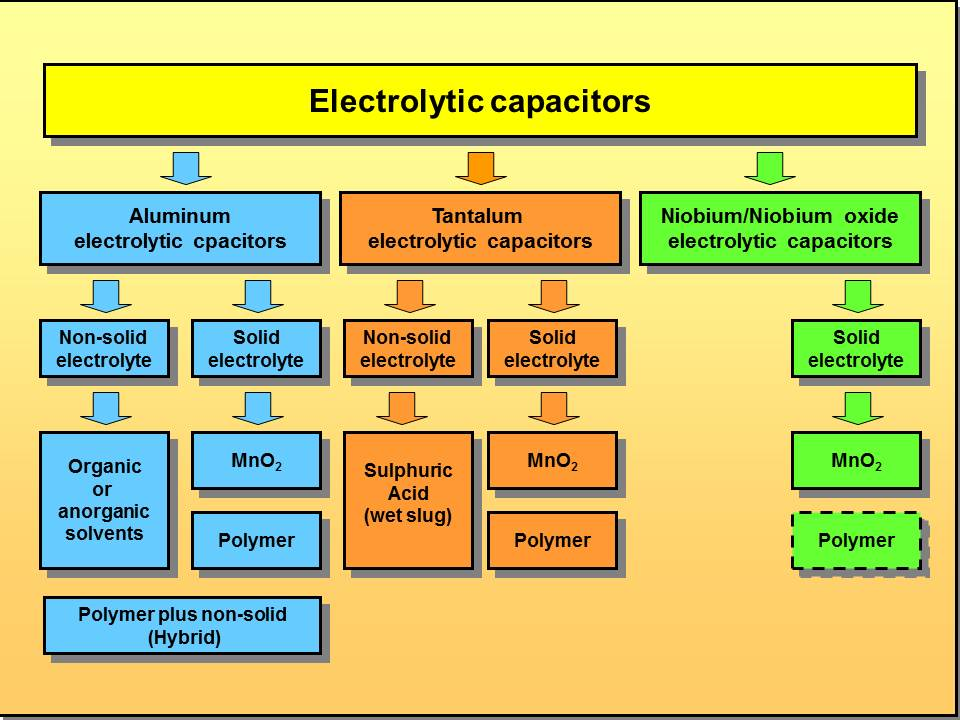
Electrolytic capacitors diversification

Electrolytic capacitors have a metallic anode covered with an oxidized layer used as dielectric. The second electrode is a non-solid (wet) or solid electrolyte. Electrolytic capacitors are polarized. Three families are available, categorized according to their dielectric.

- Aluminum electrolytic capacitors with aluminum oxide as dielectric
- Tantalum electrolytic capacitors with tantalum pentoxide as dielectric
- Niobium electrolytic capacitors with niobium pentoxide as dielectric.

The anode is highly roughened to increase the surface area. This and the relatively high permittivity of the oxide layer gives these capacitors very high capacitance per unit volume compared with film- or ceramic capacitors.

The permittivity of tantalum pentoxide is approximately three times higher than aluminium oxide, producing significantly smaller components. However, permittivity determines only the dimensions. Electrical parameters, especially conductivity, are established by the electrolyte's material and composition. Three general types of electrolytes are used:

- non solid (wet, liquid)—conductivity approximately 10 mS/cm and are the lowest cost
- solid manganese oxide—conductivity approximately 100 mS/cm offer high quality and stability
- solid conductive polymer (Polypyrrole or PEDOT:PSS)—conductivity approximately 100...500 S/cm, offer ESR values as low as <10 mΩ

Internal losses of electrolytic capacitors, prevailing used for decoupling and buffering applications, are determined by the kind of electrolyte.

Benchmarks of the different types of electrolytic capacitors
Anode material	Electrolyte	Capacitance range (μF)	Max. rated voltage at 85 °C (V)	Upper categorie temperature (°C)	Specific ripple current (mA/mm^{3})^{1)}
Aluminum (roughened foil)	non solid, e.g. Ethylene glycol, DMF, DMA, GBL	0.1–2,700,000	600	150	0.05–2.0
Aluminum (roughened foil)	solid, Manganese dioxide (MnO_{2}	0.1–1,500	40	175	0.5–2.5
Aluminum (roughened foil)	solid conductive polymer (e.g. PEDOT:PSS)	10–1,500	250	125	10–30
Tantalum (roughened foil)	non solid Sulfuric acid	0.1–1,000	630	125	–
Tantalum (sintered)	non solid sulfuric acid	0.1–15,000	150	200	–
Tantalum (sintered)	solid Manganese dioxide (MnO_{2}	0.1–3,300	125	150	1.5–15
Tantalum (sintered)	solid conductive polymer (e.g. PEDOT:PSS)	10–1,500	35	125	10–30
Niobium or niobium oxide (sintered)	solid Manganese dioxide (MnO_{2}	1–1,500	10	125	5–20
^{1)} Ripple current at 100 kHz and 85 °C / volumen (nominal dimensions)

The large capacitance per unit volume of electrolytic capacitors make them valuable in relatively high-current and low-frequency electrical circuits, e.g. in power supply filters for decoupling unwanted AC components from DC power connections or as coupling capacitors in audio amplifiers, for passing or bypassing low-frequency signals and storing large amounts of energy. The relatively high capacitance value of an electrolytic capacitor combined with the very low ESR of the polymer electrolyte of polymer capacitors, especially in SMD styles, makes them a competitor to MLC chip capacitors in personal computer power supplies.

Bipolar aluminum electrolytic capacitors (also called Non-Polarized capacitors) contain two anodized aluminum foils, behaving like two capacitors connected in series opposition.

Electrolytic capacitors for special applications include motor start capacitors, flashlight capacitors and audio frequency capacitors.

Schematic representation

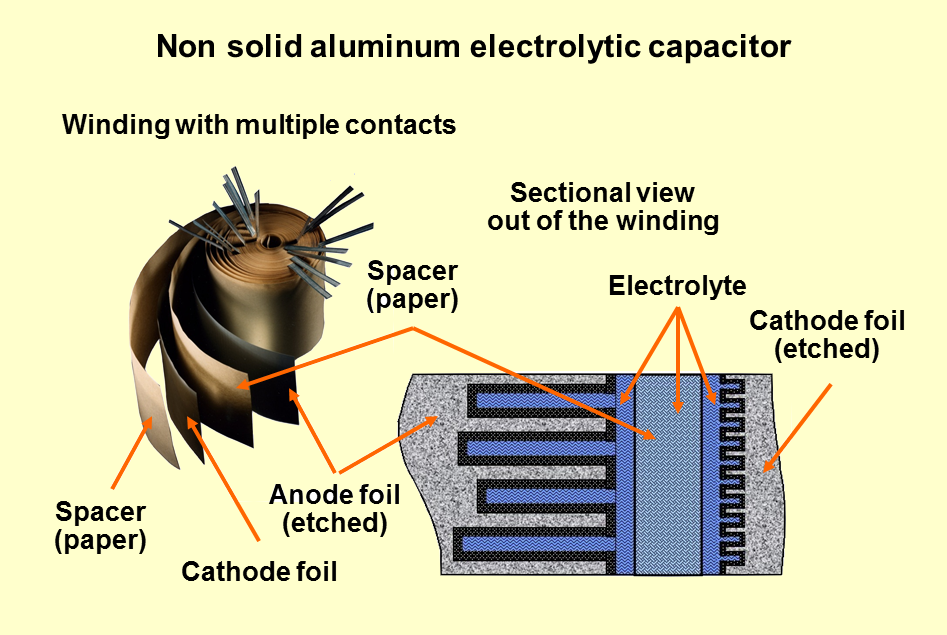
Schematic representation of the structure of a wound aluminum electrolytic capacitor with non solid (liquid) electrolyte

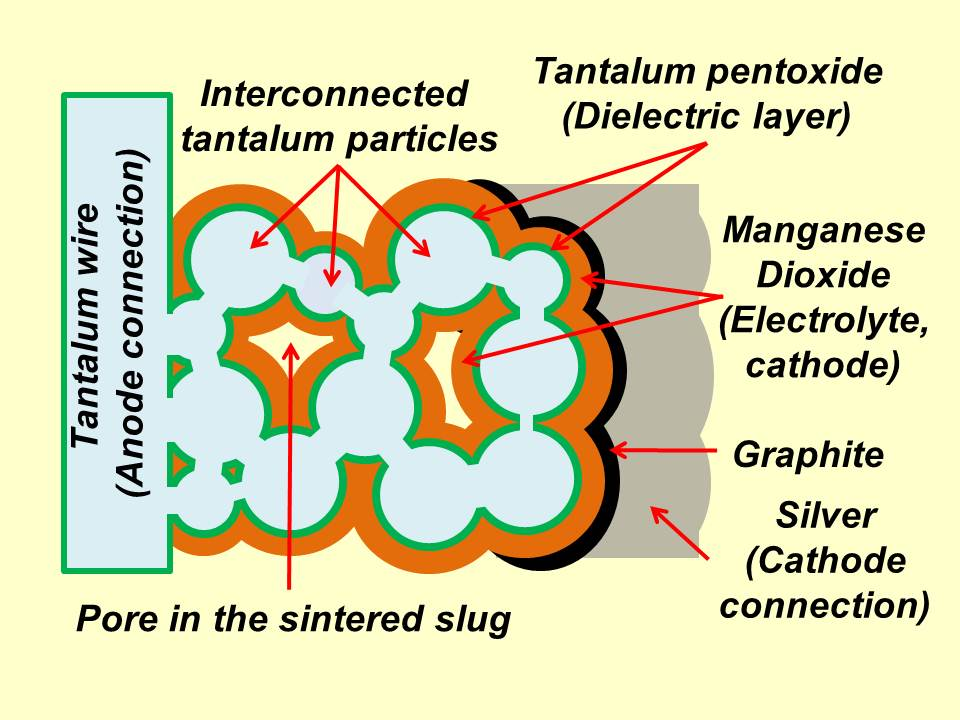
Schematic representation of the structure of a sintered tantalum electrolytic capacitor with solid electrolyte and the cathode contacting layers
Aluminum, tantalum and niobium electrolytic capacitors

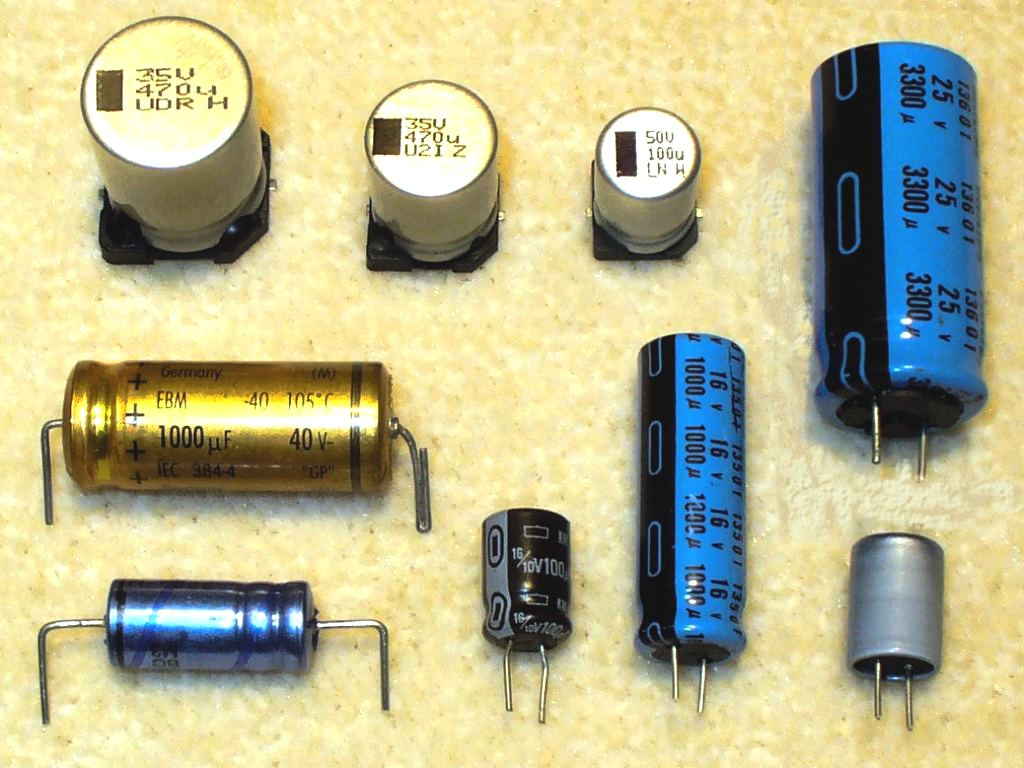
Axial, radial (single ended) and V-chip styles of aluminum electrolytic capacitors

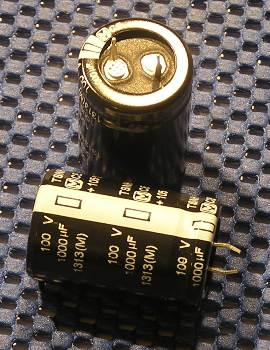
Snap-in style of aluminum electrolytic capacitors for power applications

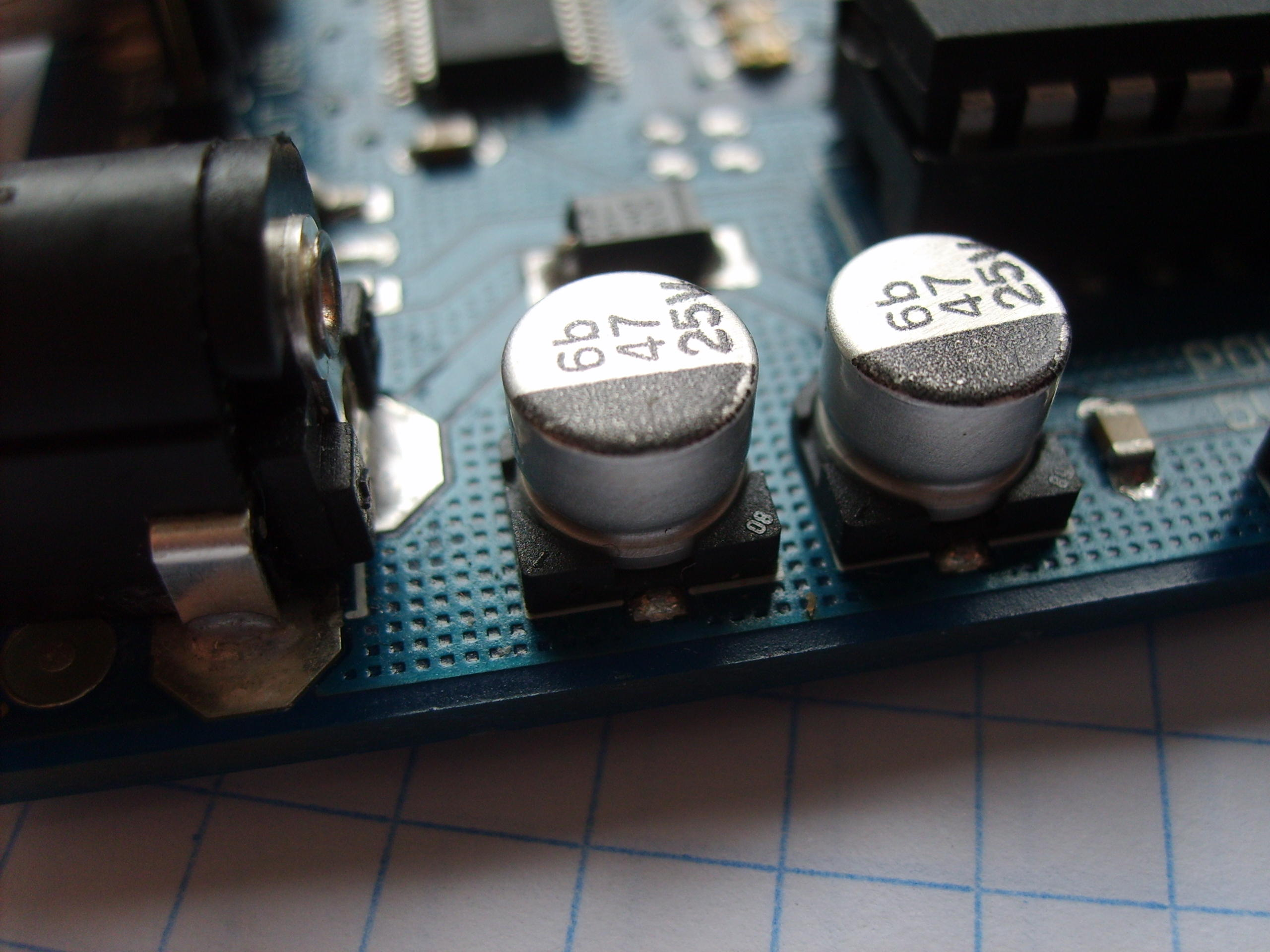
SMD style for surface mounting of aluminum electrolytic capacitors with polymer electrolyte

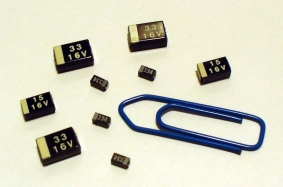
Tantalum electrolytic chip capacitors for surface mounting

=== Supercapacitors ===
Hierarchical classification of supercapacitors and related types

Ragone chart showing power density vs. energy density of various capacitors and batteries

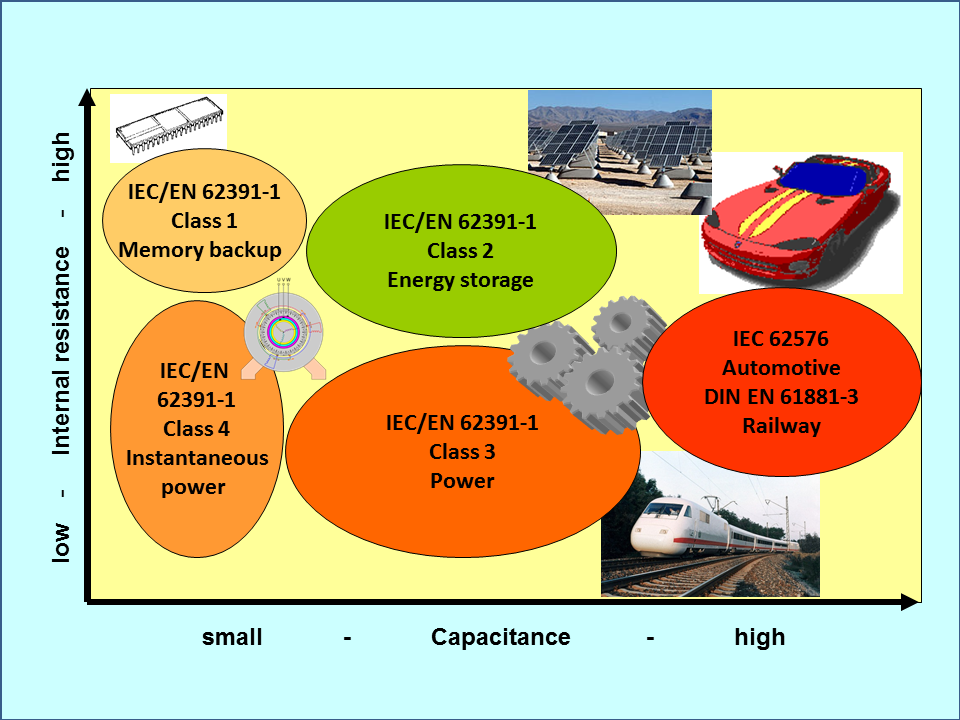
Classification of supercapacitors into classes regarding to IEC 62391-1, IEC 62567and DIN EN 61881-3 standards

Supercapacitors (SC), comprise a family of electrochemical capacitors. Supercapacitor, sometimes called ultracapacitor, is a generic term for electric double-layer capacitors (EDLC), pseudocapacitors and hybrid capacitors. They do not have a conventional solid dielectric. The capacitance value of an electrochemical capacitor is determined by two storage principles, both of which contribute to the total capacitance of the capacitor:

- Double-layer capacitance – Storage is achieved by separation of charge in a Helmholtz double layer at the interface between the surface of a conductor and an electrolytic solution. The distance of separation of charge in a double-layer is on the order of a few Angstroms (0.3–0.8 nm). This storage is electrostatic in origin.
- Pseudocapacitance – Storage is achieved by redox reactions, electroabsorption or intercalation on the surface of the electrode or by specifically absorbed ions that results in a reversible faradaic charge-transfer. The pseudocapacitance is faradaic in origin.

The ratio of the storage resulting from each principle can vary greatly, depending on electrode design and electrolyte composition. Pseudocapacitance can increase the capacitance value by as much as an order of magnitude over that of the double-layer by itself.

Supercapacitors are divided into three families, based on the design of the electrodes:

- Double-layer capacitors – with carbon electrodes or derivates with much higher static double-layer capacitance than the faradaic pseudocapacitance
- Pseudocapacitors – with electrodes out of metal oxides or conducting polymers with a high amount of faradaic pseudocapacitance
- Hybrid capacitors – capacitors with special and asymmetric electrodes that exhibit both significant double-layer capacitance and pseudocapacitance, such as lithium-ion capacitors

Supercapacitors bridge the gap between conventional capacitors and rechargeable batteries. They have the highest available capacitance values per unit volume and the greatest energy density of all capacitors. They support up to 12,000 farads/1.2 volt, with capacitance values up to 10,000 times that of electrolytic capacitors. While existing supercapacitors have energy densities that are approximately 10% of a conventional battery, their power density is generally 10 to 100 times greater. Power density is defined as the product of energy density, multiplied by the speed at which the energy is delivered to the load. The greater power density results in much shorter charge/discharge cycles than a battery is capable, and a greater tolerance for numerous charge/discharge cycles. This makes them well-suited for parallel connection with batteries, and may improve battery performance in terms of power density.

Within electrochemical capacitors, the electrolyte is the conductive connection between the two electrodes, distinguishing them from electrolytic capacitors, in which the electrolyte only forms the cathode, the second electrode.

Supercapacitors are polarized and must operate with correct polarity. Polarity is controlled by design with asymmetric electrodes, or, for symmetric electrodes, by a potential applied during the manufacturing process.

Supercapacitors support a broad spectrum of applications for power and energy requirements, including:

- Low supply current during longer times for memory backup in (SRAMs) in electronic equipment
- Power electronics that require very short, high current, as in the KERS system in Formula 1 cars
- Recovery of braking energy for vehicles such as buses and trains

Supercapacitors are rarely interchangeable, especially those with higher energy densities. IEC standard 62391-1 Fixed electric double layer capacitors for use in electronic equipment identifies four application classes:

- Class 1, Memory backup, discharge current in mA = 1 • C (F)
- Class 2, Energy storage, discharge current in mA = 0.4 • C (F) • V (V)
- Class 3, Power, discharge current in mA = 4 • C (F) • V (V)
- Class 4, Instantaneous power, discharge current in mA = 40 • C (F) • V (V)
Double-layer, Lithium-Ion and supercapacitors

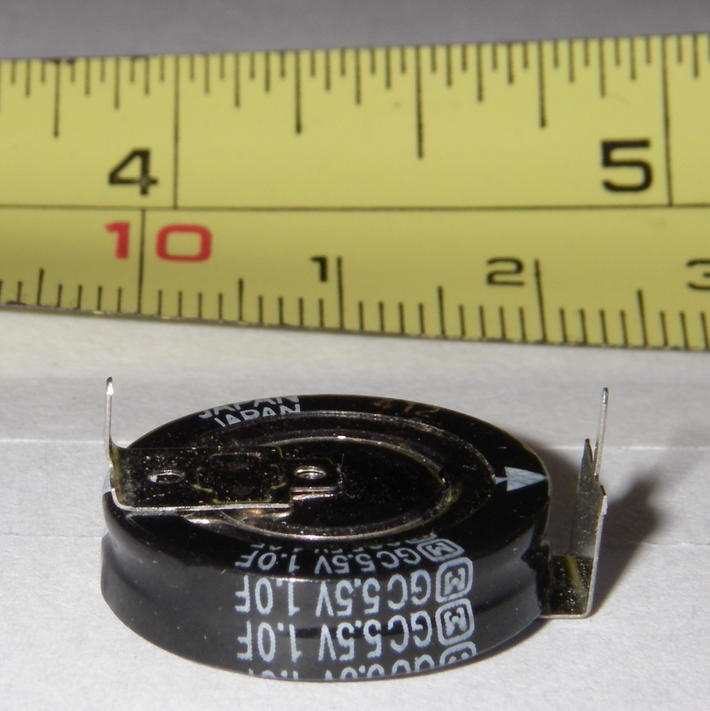
Double-layer capacitor with 1 F at 5.5 V for data retention when power is off.

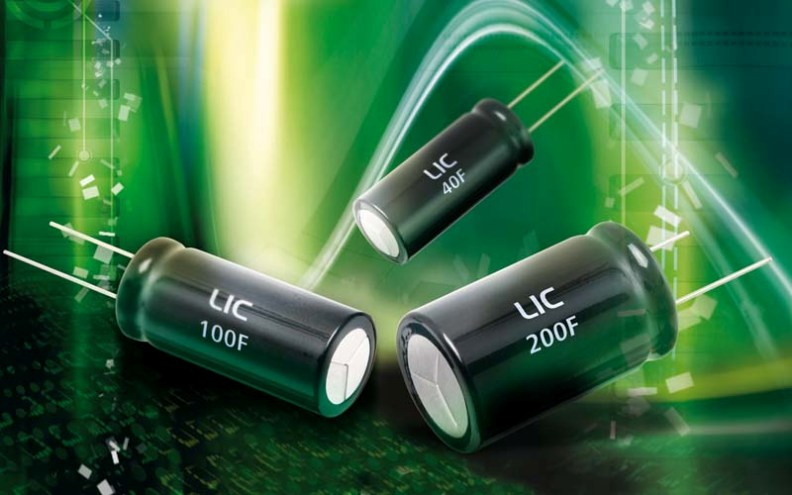
Radial (single ended) style of lithium ion capacitors for high energy density

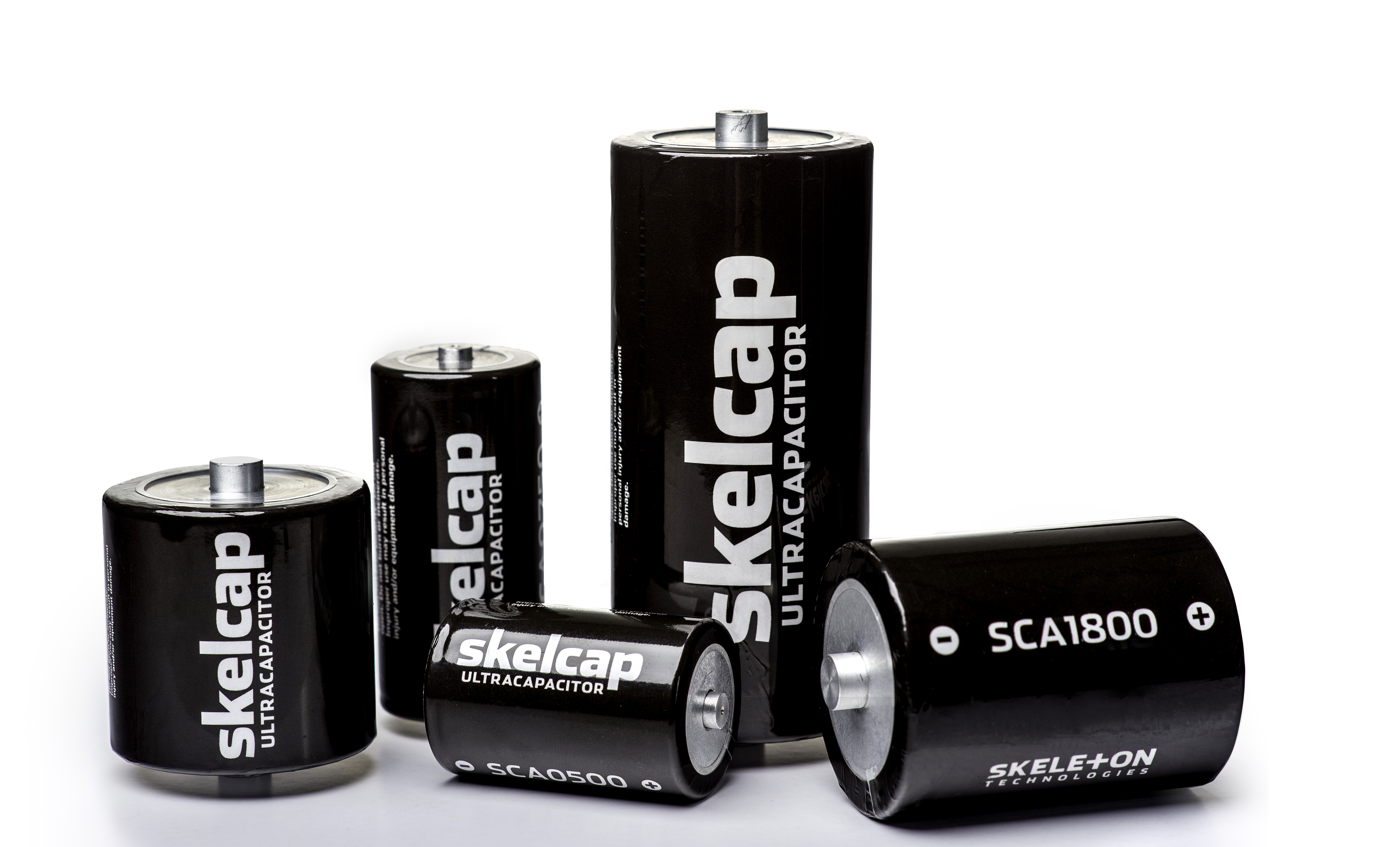
Supercapacitors

=== Class X and Class Y capacitors ===
Many safety regulations mandate that Class X or Class Y capacitors must be used whenever a "fail-to-short-circuit" could put humans in danger, to guarantee galvanic isolation even when the capacitor fails.

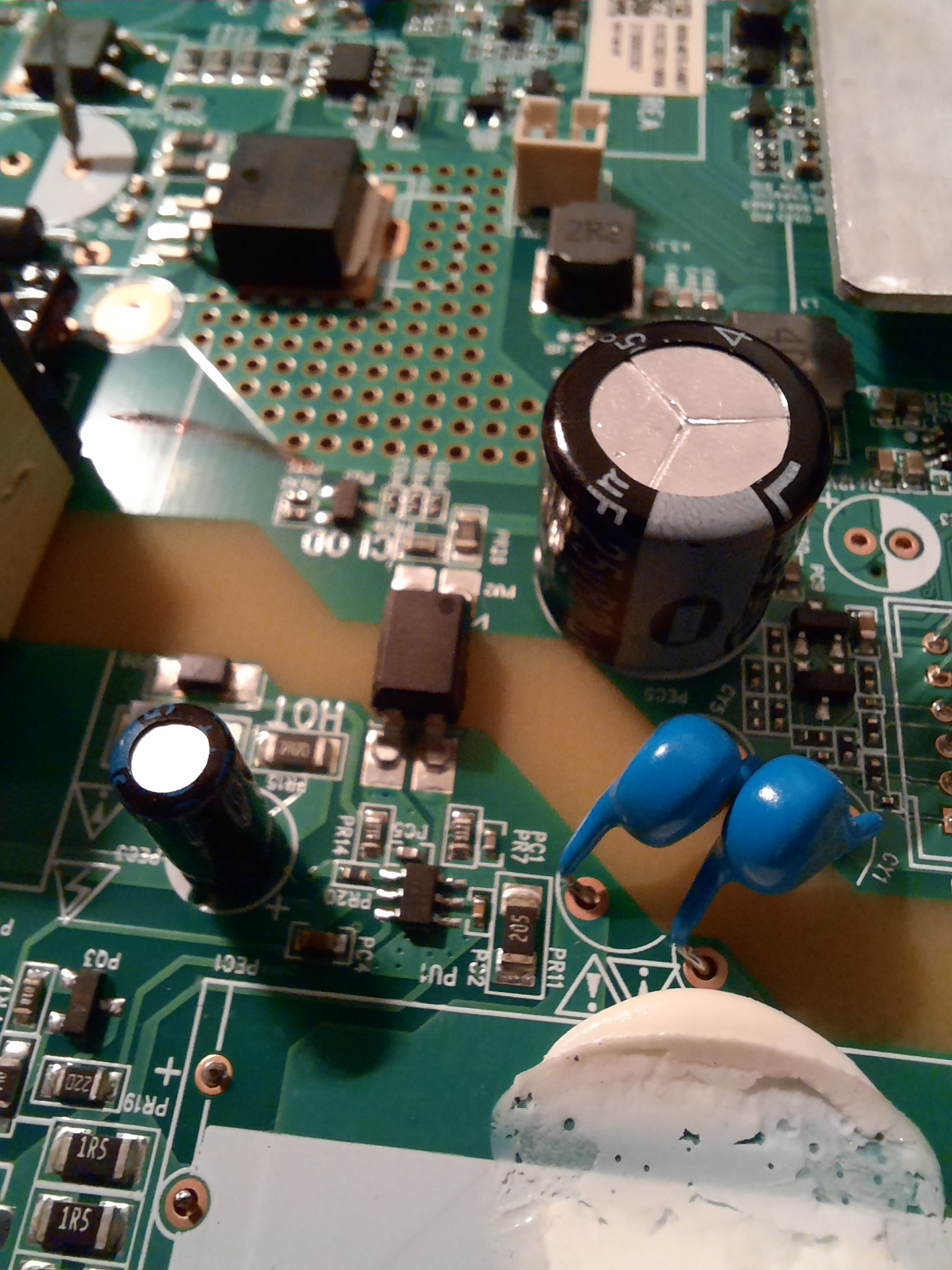
Two Class Y capacitors (blue, bottom right) on a circuit board

Lightning strikes and other sources cause high voltage surges in mains power. Safety capacitors protect humans and devices from high voltage surges by shunting the surge energy to ground.

In particular, safety regulations mandate a particular arrangement of Class X and Class Y mains filtering capacitors.

In principle, any dielectric could be used to build Class X and Class Y capacitors; perhaps by including an internal fuse to improve safety. In practice, capacitors that meet Class X and Class Y specifications are typically ceramic RFI/EMI suppression capacitors or plastic film RFI/EMI suppression capacitors.

=== Miscellaneous capacitors ===
Beneath the above described capacitors covering more or less nearly the total market of discrete capacitors some new developments or very special capacitor types as well as older types can be found in electronics.

==== Integrated capacitors ====
- Integrated capacitors—in integrated circuits, nano-scale capacitors can be formed by appropriate patterns of metallization on an isolating substrate. They may be packaged in multiple capacitor arrays with no other semiconductive parts as discrete components.
- Glass capacitors—The first Leyden jar capacitor was made of glass. As of 2012 glass capacitors were in use as SMD versions for applications requiring ultra-reliable and ultra-stable service.

==== Power capacitors ====
- Vacuum capacitors—used in high power RF transmitters
- SF_{6} gas filled capacitors—used as capacitance standard in measuring bridge circuits

==== Special capacitors ====
- Printed circuit boards—metal conductive areas in different layers of a multi-layer printed circuit board can act as a highly stable capacitor in Distributed-element filters. It is common industry practice to fill unused areas of one PCB layer with the ground conductor and another layer with the power conductor, forming a large distributed capacitor between the layers.
- Wire—2 pieces of insulated wire twisted together. Capacitance values usually range from 3 pF to 15 pF. Used in homemade VHF circuits for oscillation feedback.

Specialized devices such as built-in capacitors with metal conductive areas in different layers of a multi-layer printed circuit board and kludges such as twisting together two pieces of insulated wire also exist.

Capacitors made by twisting 2 pieces of insulated wire together are called gimmick capacitors. Gimmick capacitors were used in commercial and amateur radio receivers.

==== Obsolete capacitors ====
- Leyden jars the earliest known capacitor
- Clamped mica capacitors—the first capacitors with stable frequency behavior and low losses, used for military radio applications during World War II
- Air-gap capacitors—used by the first spark-gap transmitters
Miscellaneous capacitors

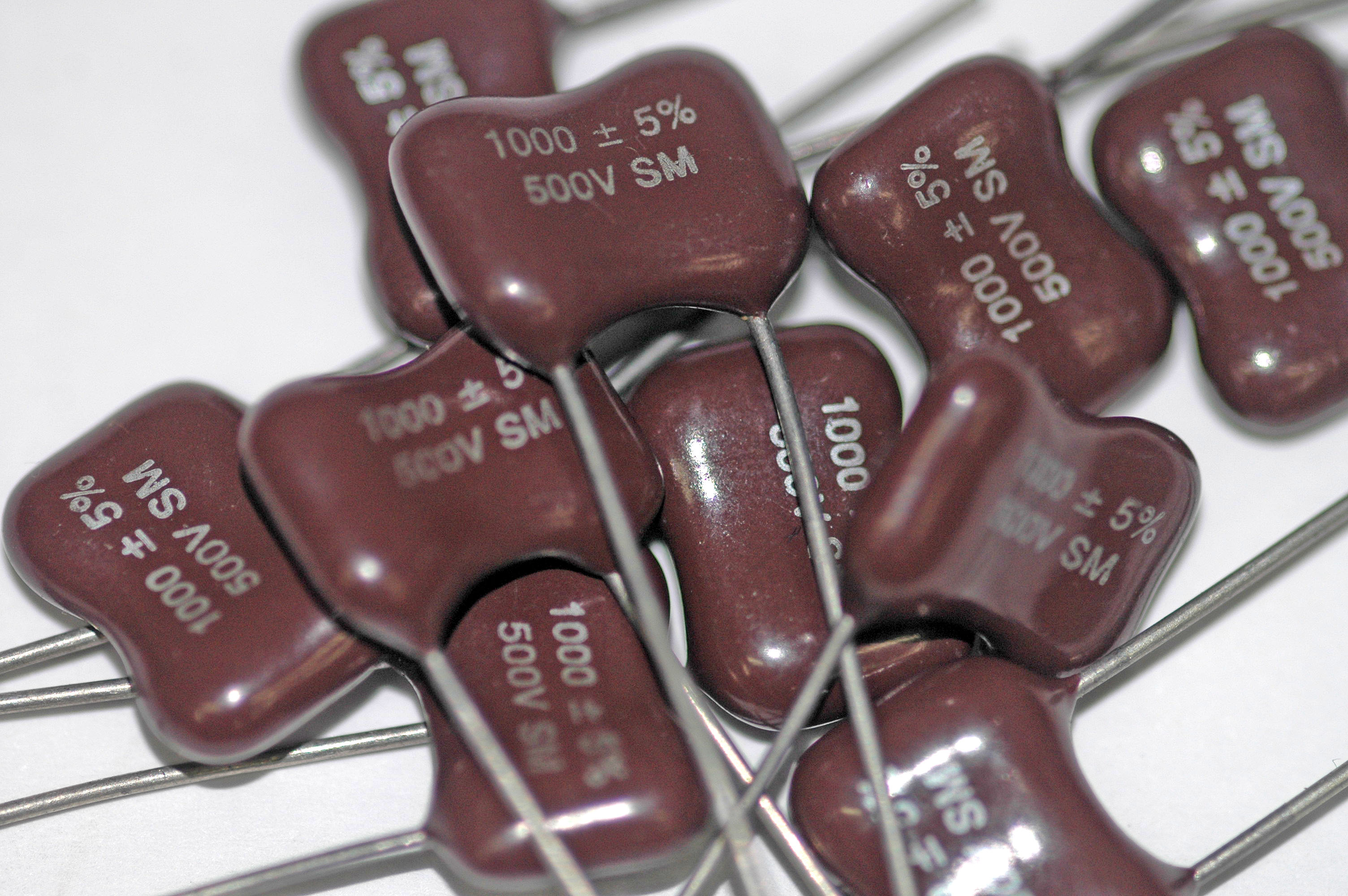
Some 1 nF × 500 VDC rated silver mica capacitors

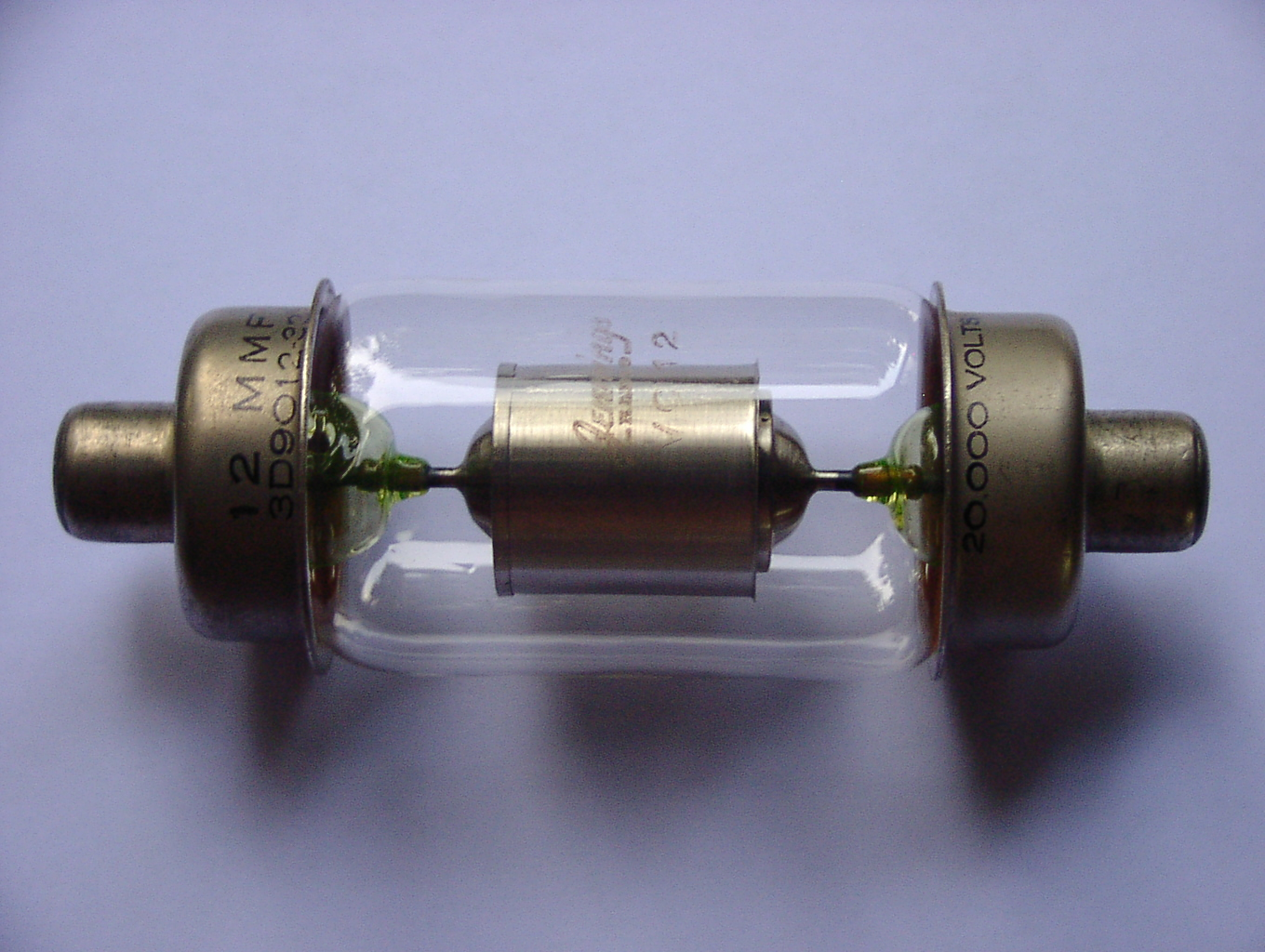
Vacuum capacitor with uranium glass encapsulation

=== Variable capacitors ===
Variable capacitors may have their capacitance changed by mechanical motion. There are two main types:

- Tuning capacitor – variable capacitor for intentionally and repeatedly tuning an oscillator circuit in a radio or another tuned circuit
- Trimmer capacitor – small variable capacitor usually for one-time oscillator circuit internal adjustment

Variable capacitors include capacitors that use a mechanical construction to change the distance between the plates, or the amount of plate surface area which overlaps. They mostly use air as dielectric medium.

Semiconductive variable capacitance diodes are not capacitors in the sense of passive components but can change their capacitance as a function of the applied reverse bias voltage and are used like a variable capacitor. They have replaced much of the tuning and trimmer capacitors.

Variable capacitors

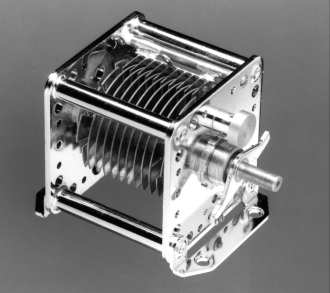
Air gap tuning capacitor

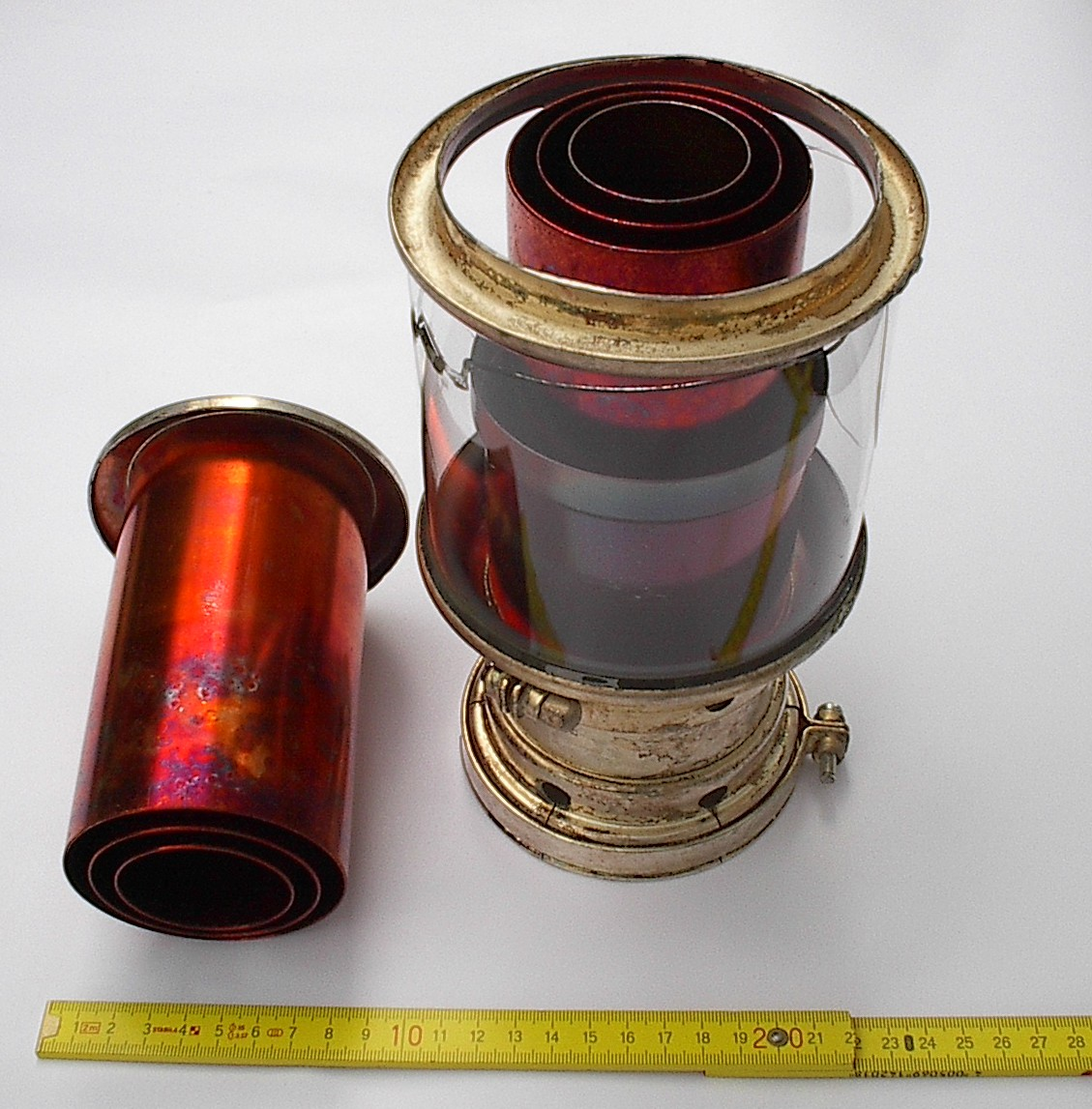
Vacuum tuning capacitor

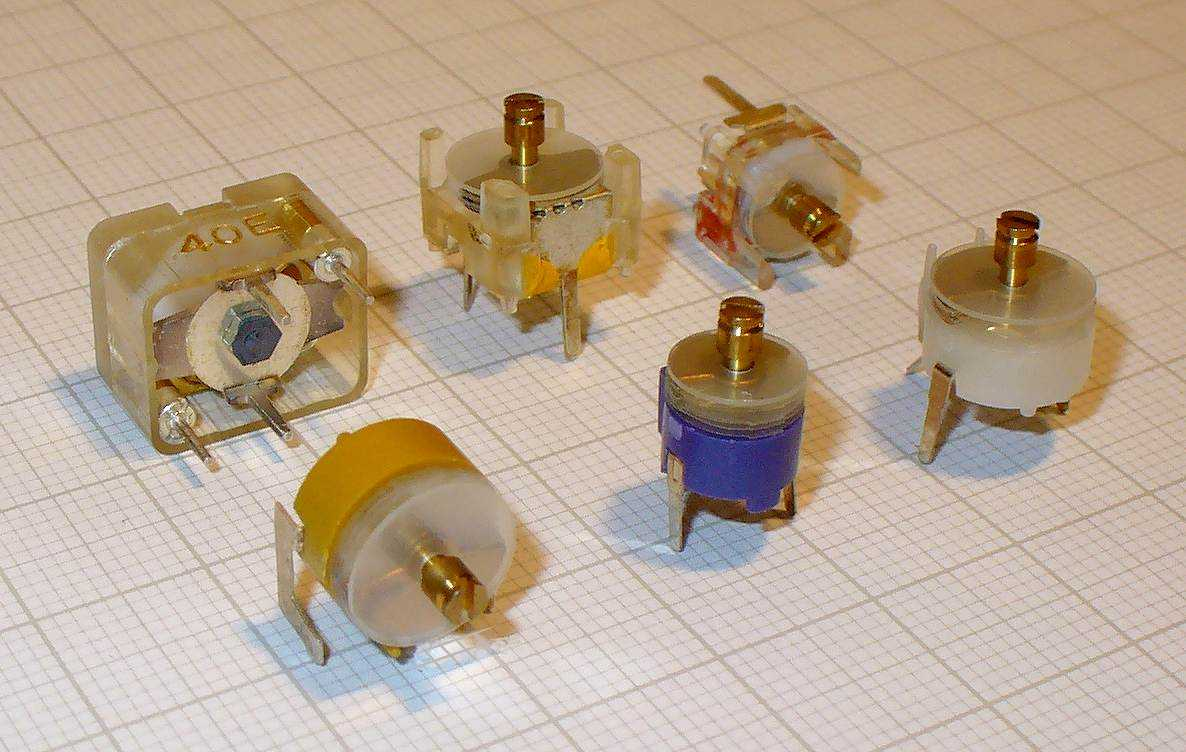
Trimmer capacitor for through hole mounting

Trimmer capacitor for surface mounting

== Comparison of types ==
Features and applications as well as disadvantages of capacitors
Capacitor type	Dielectric	Features/applications	Disadvantages
Ceramic capacitors
Ceramic Class 1 capacitors	paraelectric ceramic mixture of Titanium dioxide modified by additives	Predictable linear and low capacitance change with operating temperature. Excellent high frequency characteristics with low losses. For temperature compensation in resonant circuit application. Available in voltages up to 15,000 V	Low permittivity ceramic, capacitors with low volumetric efficiency, larger dimensions than Class 2 capacitors
Ceramic Class 2 capacitors	ferroelectric ceramic mixture of barium titanate and suitable additives	High permittivity, high volumetric efficiency, smaller dimensions than Class 1 capacitors. For buffer, by-pass and coupling applications. Available in voltages up to 50,000 V.	Lower stability and higher losses than Class 1. Capacitance changes with change in applied voltage, with frequency and with aging effects. Slightly microphonic
Film capacitors
Metallized film capacitors	PP, PET, PEN, PPS, (PTFE)	Metallized film capacitors are significantly smaller in size than film/foil versions and have self-healing properties.	Thin metallized electrodes limit the maximum current carrying capability respectively the maximum possible pulse voltage.
Film/foil film capacitors	PP, PET, PTFE	Film/foil film capacitors have the highest surge ratings/pulse voltage, respectively. Peak currents are higher than for metallized types.	No self-healing properties: internal short may be disabling. Larger dimensions than metallized alternative.
Polypropylene (PP) film capacitors	Polypropylene	Most popular film capacitor dielectric. Predictable linear and low capacitance change with operating temperature. Suitable for applications in Class-1 frequency-determining circuits and precision analog applications. Very narrow capacitances. Extremely low dissipation factor. Low moisture absorption, therefore suitable for "naked" designs with no coating. High insulation resistance. Usable in high power applications such as snubber or IGBT. Used also in AC power applications, such as in motors or power-factor correction. Very low dielectric losses. High frequency and high power applications such as induction heating. Widely used for safety/EMI suppression, including connection to power supply mains.	Maximum operating temperature of 105 °C. Relatively low permittivity of 2.2. PP film capacitors tend to be larger than other film capacitors. More susceptible to damage from transient over-voltages or voltage reversals than oil-impregnated MKV-capacitors for pulsed power applications.
Polyester (PET) film (Mylar) capacitors	Polyethylene terephthalate, Polyester (Hostaphan, Mylar)	Smaller in size than functionally comparable polypropylene film capacitors. Low moisture absorption. Have almost completely replaced metallized paper and polystyrene film for most DC applications. Mainly used for general purpose applications or semi-critical circuits with operating temperatures up to 125 °C. Operating voltages up to 60,000 V DC.	Usable at low (AC power) frequencies. Limited use in power electronics due to higher losses with increasing temperature and frequency.
Polyethylene naphthalate (PEN) film capacitors	Polyethylene naphthalate (Kaladex)	Better stability at high temperatures than PET. More suitable for high temperature applications and for SMD packaging. Mainly used for non-critical filtering, coupling and decoupling, because temperature dependencies are not significant.	Lower relative permittivity and lower dielectric strength imply larger dimensions for a given capacitance and rated voltage than PET.
Polyphenylene Sulfide (PPS) film capacitors	Polyphenylene (Torelina)	Small temperature dependence over the entire temperature range and a narrow frequency dependence in a wide frequency range. Dissipation factor is quite small and stable. Operating temperatures up to 270 °C. Suitable for SMD. Tolerate increased reflow soldering temperatures for lead-free soldering mandated by the RoHS 2002/95/European Union directive	Above 100 °C, the dissipation factor increases, increasing component temperature, but can operate without degradation. Cost is usually higher than PP.
Polytetrafluoroethylene (PTFE) (Teflon film) capacitors	Polytetrafluoroethylene (Teflon)	Lowest loss solid dielectric. Operating temperatures up to 250 °C. Extremely high insulation resistance. Good stability. Used in mission-critical applications.	Large size (due to low dielectric constant). Higher cost than other film capacitors.
Polycarbonate (PC) film capacitors	Polycarbonate	Almost completely replaced by PP	Limited manufacturers
Polystyrene (PS) film capacitors	Polystyrene (Styroflex)	Good thermal stability, high insulation, low distortion but unsuited to SMT and now almost completely replaced by PET	Limited manufacturers
Polysulphone film capacitors	Polysulfone	Similar to polycarbonate. Withstand full voltage at comparatively higher temperatures.	Only development, no series found (2012)
Polyamide film capacitors	Polyamide	Operating temperatures of up to 200 °C. High insulation resistance. Good stability. Low dissipation factor.	Only development, no series found (2012)
Polyimide film (Kapton) capacitors	Polyimide (Kapton)	Highest dielectric strength of any known plastic film dielectric.	Only development, no series found (2012)
Film-based power capacitors
Metallized paper power capacitors	Paper impregnated with insulating oil or epoxy resin	Self-healing properties. Originally impregnated with wax, oil or epoxy. Oil-Kraft paper version used in certain high voltage applications. Mostly replaced by PP.	Large size. Highly hygroscopic, absorbing moisture from the atmosphere despite plastic enclosures and impregnates. Moisture increases dielectric losses and decreases insulation resistance.
Paper film/foil power capacitors	Kraft paper impregnated with oil	Paper covered with metal foils as electrodes. Low cost. Intermittent duty, high discharge applications.	Physically large and heavy. Significantly lower energy density than PP dielectric. Not self-healing. Potential catastrophic failure due to high stored energy.
PP dielectric, field-free paper power capacitors (MKV power capacitors)	Double-sided (field-free) metallized paper as electrode carrier. PP as dielectric, impregnated with insulating oil, epoxy resin or insulating gas	Self-healing. Very low losses. High insulation resistance. High inrush current strength. High thermal stability. Heavy duty applications such as commutating with high reactive power, high frequencies and a high peak current load and other AC applications.	Physically larger than PP power capacitors.
Single- or double-sided metallized PP power capacitors	PP as dielectric, impregnated with insulating oil, epoxy resin or insulating gas	Highest capacitance per volume power capacitor. Self-healing. Broad range of applications such as general-purpose, AC capacitors, motor capacitors, smoothing or filtering, DC links, snubbing or clamping, damping AC, series resonant DC circuits, DC discharge, AC commutation, AC power-factor correction.	critical for reliable high voltage operation and very high inrush current loads, limited heat resistance (105 °C)
PP film/foil power capacitors	Impregnated PP or insulating gas, insulating oil, epoxy resin or insulating gas	Highest inrush current strength	Larger than the PP metallized versions. Not self-healing.
Electrolytic capacitors
Electrolytic capacitors with non solid (wet, liquid) electrolyte	Aluminum oxide Al_{2}O_{3}	Very large capacitance to volume ratio. Capacitance values up to 2,700,000 μF/6.3 V. Voltage up to 550 V. Lowest cost per capacitance/voltage values. Used where low losses and high capacitance stability are not of major importance, especially for lower frequencies, such as by-pass, coupling, smoothing and buffer applications in power supplies and DC-links.	Polarized. Significant leakage. Relatively high ESR and ESL values, limiting high ripple current and high frequency applications. Lifetime calculation required because drying out phenomenon. Vent or burst when overloaded, overheated or connected wrong polarized. Water based electrolyte may vent at end-of-life, showing failures like "capacitor plague"
Electrolytic capacitors with non solid (wet, liquid) electrolyte	Tantalum pentoxide Ta_{2}O_{5}	Wet tantalum electrolytic capacitors (wet slug) Lowest leakage among electrolytics. Voltage up to 630 V (tantalum film) or 125 V (tantalum sinter body). Hermetically sealed. Stable and reliable. Military and space applications.	Polarized. Violent explosion when voltage, ripple current or slew rates are exceeded, or under reverse voltage. Expensive.
Electrolytic capacitors with solid Manganese dioxide electrolyte	Aluminum oxide Al_{2}O_{3} Tantalum pentoxide Ta_{2}O_{5}, Niobium pentoxide Nb_{2}O_{5}	Tantalum and niobium with smaller dimensions for a given capacitance/voltage vs aluminum. Stable electrical parameters. Good long-term high temperature performance. Lower ESR lower than non-solid (wet) electrolytics.	Polarized. About 125 V. Low voltage and limited, transient, reverse or surge voltage tolerance. Possible combustion upon failure. ESR much higher than conductive polymer electrolytics. Manganese expected to be replaced by polymer.
Electrolytic capacitors with solid Polymer electrolyte (Polymer capacitors)	Aluminum oxide Al_{2}O_{3}, Tantalum pentoxide Ta_{2}O_{5}, Niobium pentoxide Nb_{2}O_{5}	Greatly reduced ESR compared with manganese or non-solid (wet) elelectrolytics. Higher ripple current ratings. Extended operational life. Stable electrical parameters. Self-healing. Used for smoothing and buffering in smaller power supplies especially in SMD.	Polarized. Highest leakage current among electrolytics. Higher prices than non-solid or manganese dioxide. Voltage limited to about 100 V. Explodes when voltage, current, or slew rates are exceeded or under reverse voltage.
Supercapacitors
Supercapacitors; Pseudocapacitors	Helmholtz double-layer plus faradaic pseudo-capacitance	Energy density typically tens to hundreds of times greater than conventional electrolytics. More comparable to batteries than to other capacitors. Large capacitance/volume ratio. Relatively low ESR. Thousands of farads. RAM memory backup. Temporary power during battery replacement. Rapidly absorbs/delivers much larger currents than batteries. Hundreds of thousands of charge/discharge cycles. Hybrid vehicles. Recuperation	Polarized. Low operating voltage per cell. (Stacked cells provide higher operating voltage.) Relatively high cost.
Hybrid capacitors Lithium ion capacitors (LIC)	Helmholtz double-layer plus faradaic pseudo-capacitance. Anode doped with lithium ions.	Higher operating voltage. Higher energy density than common EDLCs, but smaller than lithium ion batteries (LIB). No thermal runaway reactions.	Polarized. Low operating voltage per cell. (Stacked cells provide higher operating voltage.) Relatively high cost.
Miscellaneous capacitors
Air gap capacitors	Air	Low dielectric loss. Used for resonating HF circuits for high power HF welding.	Physically large. Relatively low capacitance.
Vacuum capacitors	Vacuum	Extremely low losses. Used for high voltage, high power RF applications, such as transmitters and induction heating. Self-healing if arc-over current is limited.	Very high cost. Fragile. Large. Relatively low capacitance.
SF_{6}-gas filled capacitors	SF_{6} gas	High precision. Extremely low losses. Very high stability. Up to 1600 kV rated voltage. Used as capacitance standard in measuring bridge circuits.	Very high cost
Metallized mica (silver mica) capacitors	Mica	Very high stability. No aging. Low losses. Used for HF and low VHF RF circuits and as capacitance standard in measuring bridge circuits. Mostly replaced by Class 1 ceramic capacitors	Higher cost than class 1 ceramic capacitors
Glass capacitors	Glass	Better stability and frequency than silver mica. Ultra-reliable. Ultra-stable. Resistant to nuclear radiation. Operating temperature: −75 °C to +200 °C and even short overexposure to +250 °C.	Higher cost than class 1 ceramic
Integrated capacitors	oxide-nitride-oxide (ONO)	Thin (down to 100 μm). Smaller footprint than most MLCC. Low ESL. Very high stability up to 200 °C. High reliability	Customized production
Variable capacitors
Air gap tuning capacitors	Air	Circular or various logarithmic cuts of the rotor electrode for different capacitance curves. Split rotor or stator cut for symmetric adjustment. Ball bearing axis for noise reduced adjustment. For high professional devices.	Large dimensions. High cost.
Vacuum tuning capacitors	Vacuum	Extremely low losses. Used for high voltage, high power RF applications, such as transmitters and induction heating. Self-healing if arc-over current is limited.	Very high cost. Fragile. Large dimensions.
SF_{6} gas filled tuning capacitor	SF_{6}	Extremely low losses. Used for very high voltage high power RF applications.	Very high cost, fragile, large dimensions
Air gap trimmer capacitors	Air	Mostly replaced by semiconductive variable capacitance diodes	High cost
Ceramic trimmer capacitors	Class 1 ceramic	Linear and stable frequency behavior over wide temperature range	High cost

== Electrical characteristics ==
=== Series-equivalent circuit ===
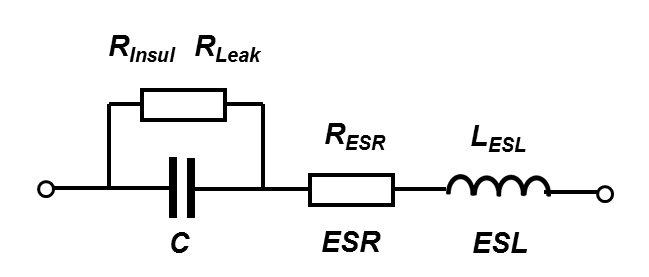
Series-equivalent circuit model of a capacitor

Discrete capacitors deviate from the ideal capacitor. An ideal capacitor only stores and releases electrical energy, with no dissipation. Capacitor components have losses and parasitic inductive parts. These imperfections in material and construction can have positive implications such as linear frequency and temperature behavior in class 1 ceramic capacitors. Conversely, negative implications include the non-linear, voltage-dependent capacitance in class 2 ceramic capacitors or the insufficient dielectric insulation of capacitors leading to leakage currents.

All properties can be defined and specified by a series equivalent circuit composed out of an idealized capacitance and additional electrical components which model all losses and inductive parameters of a capacitor. In this series-equivalent circuit the electrical characteristics are defined by:

- C, the capacitance of the capacitor
- R_{insul}, the insulation resistance of the dielectric, not to be confused with the insulation of the housing
- R_{leak}, the resistance representing the leakage current of the capacitor
- R_{ESR}, the equivalent series resistance which summarizes all ohmic losses of the capacitor, usually abbreviated as "ESR"
- L_{ESL}, the equivalent series inductance which is the effective self-inductance of the capacitor, usually abbreviated as "ESL".

Using a series equivalent circuit instead of a parallel equivalent circuit is specified by IEC/EN 60384–1.

=== Standard capacitance values and tolerances ===
The rated capacitance C_{R} or nominal capacitance C_{N} is the value for which the capacitor has been designed. Actual capacitance depends on the measured frequency and ambient temperature. Standard measuring conditions are a low-voltage AC measuring method at a temperature of 20 °C with frequencies of

- 100 kHz, 1 MHz (preferred) or 10 MHz for non-electrolytic capacitors with C_{R} ≤ 1 nF:
- 1 kHz or 10 kHz for non-electrolytic capacitors with 1 nF < C_{R} ≤ 10 μF
- 100/120 Hz for electrolytic capacitors
- 50/60 Hz or 100/120 Hz for non-electrolytic capacitors with C_{R} > 10 μF

For supercapacitors a voltage drop method is applied for measuring the capacitance value. .

Capacitors are available in geometrically increasing preferred values (E series standards) specified in IEC/EN 60063. According to the number of values per decade, these were called the E3, E6, E12, E24 etc. series. The range of units used to specify capacitor values has expanded to include everything from pico- (pF), nano- (nF) and microfarad (μF) to farad (F). Millifarad and kilofarad are uncommon.

The percentage of allowed deviation from the rated value is called tolerance. The actual capacitance value should be within its tolerance limits, or it is out of specification. IEC/EN 60062 specifies a letter code for each tolerance.

Tolerances of capacitors and their letter codes
E series	Tolerance			
E series	C_{R} > 10 pF	Letter code	C_{R} < 10 pF	Letter code
E 96	1%	F	0.1 pF	B
E 48	2%	G	0.25 pF	C
E 24	5%	J	0.5 pF	D
E 12	10%	K	1 pF	F
E 6	20%	M	2 pF	G
E3	−20/+50%	S	–	–
E3	−20/+80%	Z	–	–

The required tolerance is determined by the particular application. The narrow tolerances of E24 to E96 are used for high-quality circuits such as precision oscillators and timers. General applications such as non-critical filtering or coupling circuits employ E12 or E6. Electrolytic capacitors, which are often used for filtering and bypassing capacitors mostly have a tolerance range of ±20% and need to conform to E6 (or E3) series values.

=== Temperature dependence ===
Capacitance typically varies with temperature. The different dielectrics express great differences in temperature sensitivity. The temperature coefficient is expressed in parts per million (ppm) per degree Celsius for class 1 ceramic capacitors or in % over the total temperature range for all others.

Temperature coefficients of some common capacitors
Type of capacitor, dielectric material	Temperature coefficient C/C_{0}	Application temperature range
Ceramic capacitor class 1 paraelectric NP0	± 30 ppm/K (±0.5%)	−55 to +125 °C
Ceramic capacitor class 2 ferroelectric X7R	±15%	−55 to +125 °C
Ceramic capacitor class 2, ferroelectric Y5V	+22% / −82 %	−30 to +85 °C
Film capacitor Polypropylene ( PP)	±2.5%	−55 to +85/105 °C
Film capacitor Polyethylen terephthalate, Polyester (PET)	+5%	−55 to +125/150 °C
Film capacitor Polyphenylene sulfide (PPS)	±1.5%	−55 to +150 °C
Film capacitor Polyethylene naphthalate (PEN)	±5%	−40 to +125/150 °C
Film capacitor Polytetrafluoroethylene (PTFE)	?	−40 to +130 °C
Metallized paper capacitor (impregnated)	±10%	−25 to +85 °C
Aluminum electrolytic capacitor Al_{2}O_{3}	±20%	−40 to +85/105/125 °C
Tantalum electrolytic capacitor Ta_{2}O_{5}	±20%	−40 to +125 °C

=== Frequency dependence ===
Most discrete capacitor types have more or less capacitance changes with increasing frequencies. The dielectric strength of class 2 ceramic and plastic film diminishes with rising frequency. Therefore, their capacitance value decreases with increasing frequency. This phenomenon for ceramic class 2 and plastic film dielectrics is related to dielectric relaxation in which the time constant of the electrical dipoles is the reason for the frequency dependence of permittivity. The graphs below show typical frequency behavior of the capacitance for ceramic and film capacitors.

Frequency dependence of capacitance for ceramic and film capacitors

Frequency dependence of capacitance for ceramic class 2 capacitors (NP0 class 1 for comparisation)

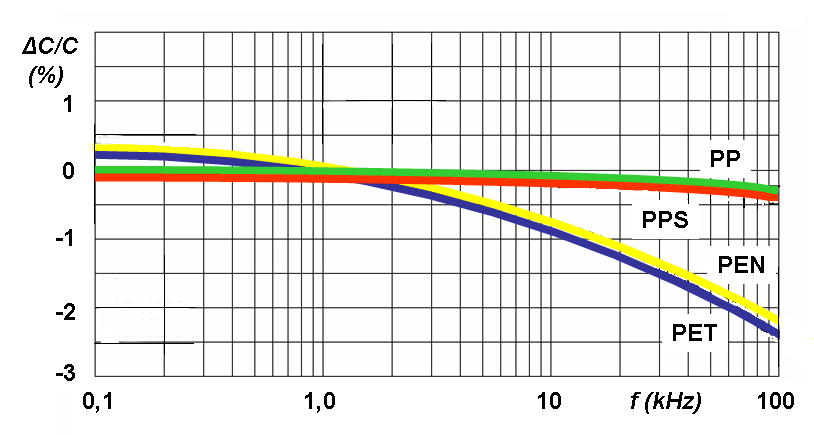
Frequency dependence of capacitance for film capacitors with different film materials

For electrolytic capacitors with non-solid electrolyte, mechanical motion of the ions occurs. Their movability is limited so that at higher frequencies not all areas of the roughened anode structure are covered with charge-carrying ions. As higher the anode structure is roughened as more the capacitance value decreases with increasing frequency. Low voltage types with highly roughened anodes display capacitance at 100 kHz approximately 10 to 20% of the value measured at 100 Hz.

=== Voltage dependence ===
Capacitance may also change with applied voltage. This effect is more prevalent in class 2 ceramic capacitors. The permittivity of ferroelectric class 2 material depends on the applied voltage. Higher applied voltage lowers permittivity. The change of capacitance can drop to 80% of the value measured with the standardized measuring voltage of 0.5 or 1.0 V. This behavior is a small source of non-linearity in low-distortion filters and other analog applications. In audio applications this can cause distortion (measured using THD).

Film capacitors and electrolytic capacitors have no significant voltage dependence.

Voltage dependence of capacitance for some different class 2 ceramic capacitors

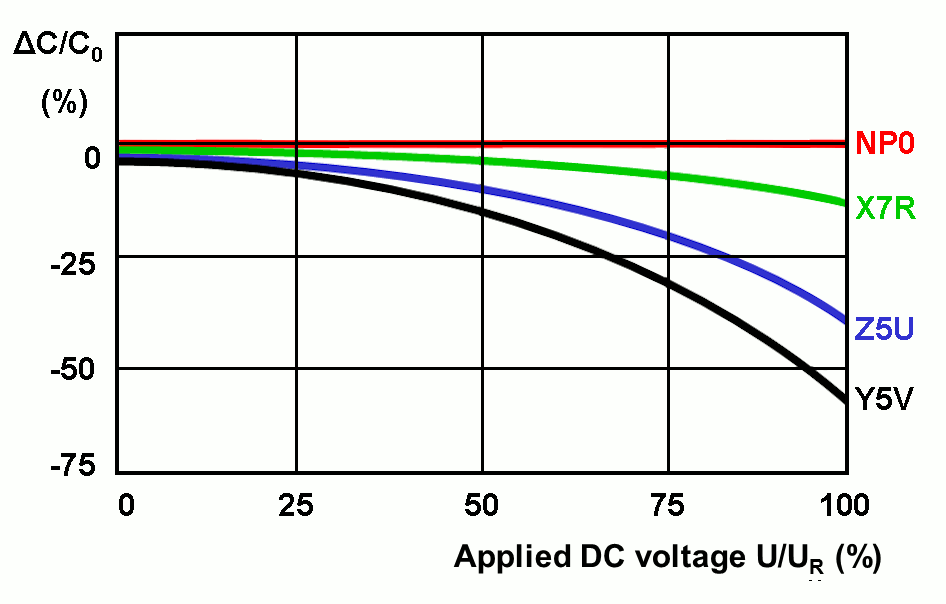
Simplified diagram of the change in capacitance as a function of the applied voltage for 25 V capacitors in different kind of ceramic grades

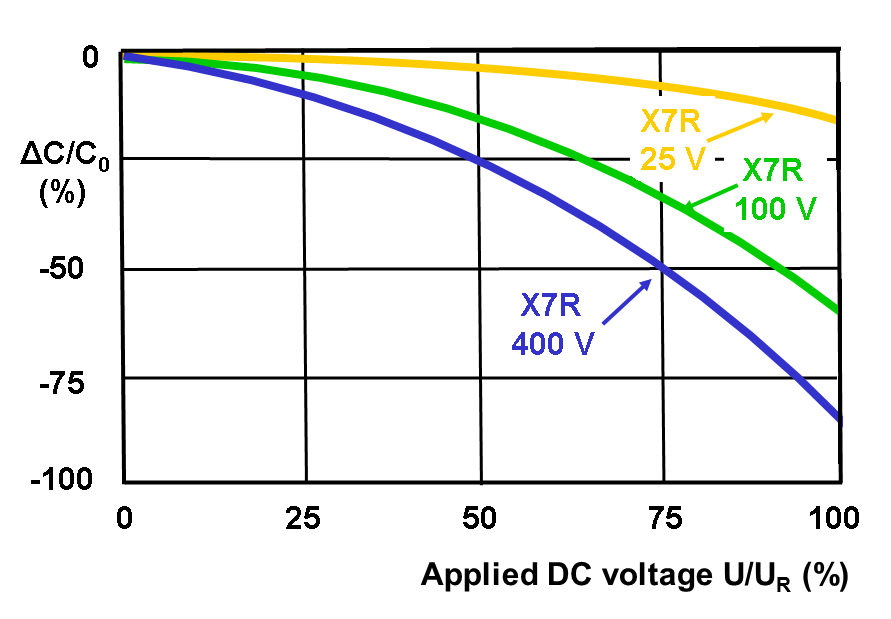
Simplified diagram of the change in capacitance as a function of applied voltage for X7R ceramics with different rated voltages

=== Rated and category voltage ===
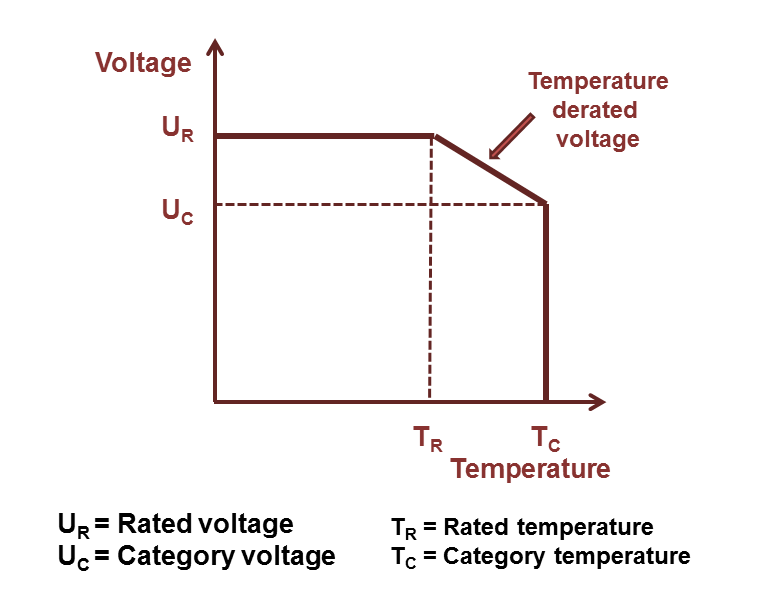
Relation between rated and category temperature range and applied voltage

The voltage at which the dielectric becomes conductive is called the breakdown voltage, and is given by the product of the dielectric strength and the separation between the electrodes. The dielectric strength depends on temperature, frequency, shape of the electrodes, etc. Because a breakdown in a capacitor normally is a short circuit and destroys the component, the operating voltage is lower than the breakdown voltage. The operating voltage is specified such that the voltage may be applied continuously throughout the life of the capacitor.

In IEC/EN 60384-1 the allowed operating voltage is called "rated voltage" or "nominal voltage". The rated voltage (UR) is the maximum DC voltage or peak pulse voltage that may be applied continuously at any temperature within the rated temperature range.

The voltage proof of nearly all capacitors decreases with increasing temperature. Some applications require a higher temperature range. Lowering the voltage applied at a higher temperature maintains safety margins. For some capacitor types therefore the IEC standard specify a second "temperature derated voltage" for a higher temperature range, the "category voltage". The category voltage (UC) is the maximum DC voltage or peak pulse voltage that may be applied continuously to a capacitor at any temperature within the category temperature range.

The relation between both voltages and temperatures is given in the picture right.

=== Impedance ===
Simplified series-equivalent circuit of a capacitor for higher frequencies (above); vector diagram with electrical reactances X_{ESL} and X_{C} and resistance ESR and for illustration the impedance Z and dissipation factor tan δ

In general, a capacitor is seen as a storage component for electric energy. But this is only one capacitor function. A capacitor can also act as an AC resistor. In many cases the capacitor is used as a decoupling capacitor to filter or bypass undesired biased AC frequencies to the ground. Other applications use capacitors for capacitive coupling of AC signals; the dielectric is used only for blocking DC. For such applications the AC resistance is as important as the capacitance value.

The frequency dependent AC resistance is called impedance $\scriptstyle Z$ and is the complex ratio of the voltage to the current in an AC circuit. Impedance extends the concept of resistance to AC circuits and possesses both magnitude and phase at a particular frequency. This is unlike resistance, which has only magnitude.

$$\ Z = |Z| e^{j\theta}$$

The magnitude $\scriptstyle |Z|$ represents the ratio of the voltage difference amplitude to the current amplitude, $\scriptstyle j$ is the imaginary unit, while the argument $\scriptstyle \theta$ gives the phase difference between voltage and current.

In capacitor data sheets, only the impedance magnitude |Z| is specified, and simply written as "Z" so that the formula for the impedance can be written in Cartesian form

$$\ Z = R + jX$$

where the real part of impedance is the resistance $\scriptstyle R$ (for capacitors $\scriptstyle ESR$) and the imaginary part is the reactance $\scriptstyle X$.

As shown in a capacitor's series-equivalent circuit, the real component includes an ideal capacitor $C$, an inductance $L (ESL)$ and a resistor $R (ESR)$. The total reactance at the angular frequency $\omega$ therefore is given by the geometric (complex) addition of a capacitive reactance (Capacitance) $X_C= -\frac{1}{\omega C}$ and an inductive reactance (Inductance): $X_L=\omega L_{\mathrm{ESL}}$.

To calculate the impedance $\scriptstyle Z$ the resistance has to be added geometrically and then $Z$ is given by

$Z=\sqrt{{ESR}^2 + (X_\mathrm{C} + (-X_\mathrm{L}))^2}$. The impedance is a measure of the capacitor's ability to pass alternating currents. In this sense the impedance can be used like Ohms law
$$Z = \frac{\hat u}{\hat \imath} = \frac{U_\mathrm{eff}}{I_\mathrm{eff}}.$$

to calculate either the peak or the effective value of the current or the voltage.

In the special case of resonance, in which the both reactive resistances

$X_C= -\frac{1}{\omega C}$ and $X_L=\omega L_{\mathrm{ESL}}$

have the same value ($X_C=X_L$), then the impedance will only be determined by ${ESR}$.

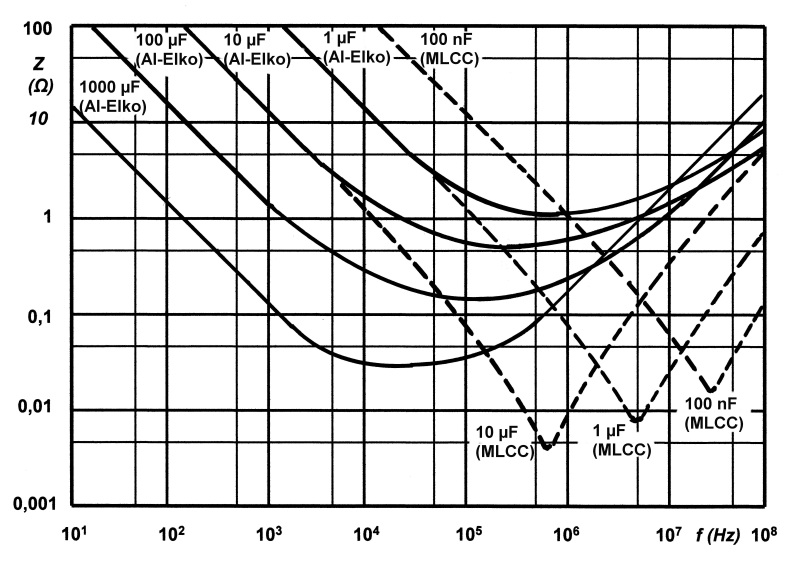
Typical impedance curves for different capacitance values over frequency showing the typical form with a decreasing impedance values below resonance and increasing values above resonance. As higher the capacitance as lower the resonance.

The impedance specified in the datasheets often show typical curves for the different capacitance values. With increasing frequency as the impedance decreases down to a minimum. The lower the impedance, the more easily alternating currents can be passed through the capacitor. At the apex, the point of resonance, where XC has the same value than XL, the capacitor has the lowest impedance value. Here only the ESR determines the impedance. With frequencies above the resonance the impedance increases again due to the ESL of the capacitor. The capacitor becomes an inductance.

As shown in the graph, the higher capacitance values can fit the lower frequencies better while the lower capacitance values can fit better the higher frequencies.

Aluminum electrolytic capacitors have relatively good decoupling properties in the lower frequency range up to about 1 MHz due to their large capacitance values. This is the reason for using electrolytic capacitors in standard or switched-mode power supplies behind the rectifier for smoothing application.

Ceramic and film capacitors are already out of their smaller capacitance values suitable for higher frequencies up to several 100 MHz. They also have significantly lower parasitic inductance, making them suitable for higher frequency applications, due to their construction with end-surface contacting of the electrodes. To increase the range of frequencies, often an electrolytic capacitor is connected in parallel with a ceramic or film capacitor.

Many new developments are targeted at reducing parasitic inductance (ESL). This increases the resonance frequency of the capacitor and, for example, can follow the constantly increasing switching speed of digital circuits. Miniaturization, especially in the SMD multilayer ceramic chip capacitors (MLCC), increases the resonance frequency. Parasitic inductance is further lowered by placing the electrodes on the longitudinal side of the chip instead of the lateral side. The "face-down" construction associated with multi-anode technology in tantalum electrolytic capacitors further reduced ESL. Capacitor families such as the so-called MOS capacitor or silicon capacitors offer solutions when capacitors at frequencies up to the GHz range are needed.

=== Inductance (ESL) and self-resonant frequency ===
ESL in industrial capacitors is mainly caused by the leads and internal connections used to connect the capacitor plates to the outside world. Large capacitors tend to have higher ESL than small ones because the distances to the plate are longer and every mm counts as an inductance.

For any discrete capacitor, there is a frequency above DC at which it ceases to behave as a pure capacitor. This frequency, where $X_C$ is as high as $X_L$, is called the self-resonant frequency. The self-resonant frequency is the lowest frequency at which the impedance passes through a minimum. For any AC application the self-resonant frequency is the highest frequency at which capacitors can be used as a capacitive component.

This is critically important for decoupling high-speed logic circuits from the power supply. The decoupling capacitor supplies transient current to the chip. Without decouplers, the IC demands current faster than the connection to the power supply can supply it, as parts of the circuit rapidly switch on and off. To counter this potential problem, circuits frequently use multiple bypass capacitors—small (100 nF or less) capacitors rated for high frequencies, a large electrolytic capacitor rated for lower frequencies and occasionally, an intermediate value capacitor.

=== Ohmic losses, ESR, dissipation factor, and quality factor ===
The summarized losses in discrete capacitors are ohmic AC losses. DC losses are specified as "leakage current" or "insulating resistance" and are negligible for an AC specification. AC losses are non-linear, possibly depending on frequency, temperature, age or humidity. The losses result from two physical conditions:

- line losses including internal supply line resistances, the contact resistance of the electrode contact, line resistance of the electrodes, and in "wet" aluminum electrolytic capacitors and especially supercapacitors, the limited conductivity of liquid electrolytes and
- dielectric losses from dielectric polarization.

The largest share of these losses in larger capacitors is usually the frequency dependent ohmic dielectric losses. For smaller components, especially for wet electrolytic capacitors, conductivity of liquid electrolytes may exceed dielectric losses. To measure these losses, the measurement frequency must be set. Since commercially available components offer capacitance values cover 15 orders of magnitude, ranging from pF (10^{−12} F) to some 1000 F in supercapacitors, it is not possible to capture the entire range with only one frequency. IEC 60384-1 states that ohmic losses should be measured at the same frequency used to measure capacitance. These are:

- 100 kHz, 1 MHz (preferred) or 10 MHz for non-electrolytic capacitors with C_{R} ≤ 1 nF:
- 1 kHz or 10 kHz for non-electrolytic capacitors with 1 nF < C_{R} ≤ 10 μF
- 100/120 Hz for electrolytic capacitors
- 50/60 Hz or 100/120 Hz for non-electrolytic capacitors with C_{R} > 10 μF

A capacitor's summarized resistive losses may be specified either as ESR, as a dissipation factor(DF, tan δ), or as quality factor (Q), depending on application requirements.

Capacitors with higher ripple current $I_R$ loads, such as electrolytic capacitors, are specified with equivalent series resistance ESR. ESR can be shown as an ohmic part in the above vector diagram. ESR values are specified in datasheets per individual type.

The losses of film capacitors and some class 2 ceramic capacitors are mostly specified with the dissipation factor tan δ. These capacitors have smaller losses than electrolytic capacitors and mostly are used at higher frequencies up to some hundred MHz. However the numeric value of the dissipation factor, measured at the same frequency, is independent of the capacitance value and can be specified for a capacitor series with a range of capacitance. The dissipation factor is determined as the tangent of the reactance ($X_C - X_L$) and the ESR, and can be shown as the angle δ between imaginary and the impedance axis.

If the inductance $ESL$ is small, the dissipation factor can be approximated as:

$$\tan \delta = ESR \cdot \omega C$$

Capacitors with very low losses, such as ceramic Class 1 and Class 2 capacitors, specify resistive losses with a quality factor (Q). Ceramic Class 1 capacitors are especially suitable for LC resonant circuits with frequencies up to the GHz range, and precise high and low pass filters. For an electrically resonant system, Q represents the effect of electrical resistance and characterizes a resonator's bandwidth $B$ relative to its center or resonant frequency $f_0$. Q is defined as the reciprocal value of the dissipation factor.

$$Q = \frac{1}{\tan \delta} = \frac{f_0}{B} \$$

A high Q value is for resonant circuits a mark of the quality of the resonance.

Comparization of ohmic losses for different capacitor types for resonant circuits (Reference frequency 1 MHz)
Capacitor type	Capacitance (pF)	ESR at 100 kHz (mΩ)	ESR at 1 MHz (mΩ)	tan δ at 1 MHz (10^{−4})	Quality factor
Silicon capacitor	560	400	—	2,5	4000
Mica capacitor	1000	650	65	4	2500
Class 1 ceramic capacitor (NP0)	1000	1600	160	10	1000

=== Limiting current loads ===
A capacitor can act as an AC resistor, coupling AC voltage and AC current between two points. Every AC current flow through a capacitor generates heat inside the capacitor body. These dissipation power loss $P$ is caused by $ESR$ and is the squared value of the effective (RMS) current $I$

$$P = I^2 \cdot ESR$$

The same power loss can be written with the dissipation factor $\tan \delta$ as

$$P = \frac{U^2 \cdot \tan \delta}{2\pi f \cdot C}$$

The internal generated heat has to be distributed to the ambient. The temperature of the capacitor, which is established on the balance between heat produced and distributed, shall not exceed the capacitors maximum specified temperature. Hence, the ESR or dissipation factor is a mark for the maximum power (AC load, ripple current, pulse load, etc.) a capacitor is specified for.

AC currents may be a:

- ripple current—an effective (RMS) AC current, coming from an AC voltage superimposed of a DC bias, a
- pulse current—an AC peak current, coming from a voltage peak, or an
- AC current—an effective (RMS) sinusoidal current

Ripple and AC currents mainly warms the capacitor body. By this currents internal generated temperature influences the breakdown voltage of the dielectric. Higher temperature lower the voltage proof of all capacitors. In wet electrolytic capacitors higher temperatures force the evaporation of electrolytes, shortening the life time of the capacitors. In film capacitors higher temperatures may shrink the plastic film changing the capacitor's properties.

Pulse currents, especially in metallized film capacitors, heat the contact areas between end spray (schoopage) and metallized electrodes. This may reduce the contact to the electrodes, heightening the dissipation factor.

For safe operation, the maximal temperature generated by any AC current flow through the capacitor is a limiting factor, which in turn limits AC load, ripple current, pulse load, etc.

==== Ripple current ====
A "ripple current" is the RMS value of a superimposed AC current of any frequency and any waveform of the current curve for continuous operation at a specified temperature. It arises mainly in power supplies (including switched-mode power supplies) after rectifying an AC voltage and flows as charge and discharge current through the decoupling or smoothing capacitor. The "rated ripple current" shall not exceed a temperature rise of 3, 5 or 10 °C, depending on the capacitor type, at the specified maximum ambient temperature.

Ripple current generates heat within the capacitor body due to the ESR of the capacitor. The components of capacitor ESR are: the dielectric losses caused by the changing field strength in the dielectric, the resistance of the supply conductor, and the resistance of the electrolyte. For an electric double layer capacitor (ELDC) these resistance values can be derived from a Nyquist plot of the capacitor's complex impedance.

ESR is dependent on frequency and temperature. For ceramic and film capacitors in generally ESR decreases with increasing temperatures but heighten with higher frequencies due to increasing dielectric losses. For electrolytic capacitors up to roughly 1 MHz ESR decreases with increasing frequencies and temperatures.

The types of capacitors used for power applications have a specified rated value for maximum ripple current. These are primarily aluminum electrolytic capacitors, and tantalum as well as some film capacitors and Class 2 ceramic capacitors.

Aluminum electrolytic capacitors, the most common type for power supplies, experience shorter life expectancy at higher ripple currents. Exceeding the limit tends to result in explosive failure.

Tantalum electrolytic capacitors with solid manganese dioxide electrolyte are also limited by ripple current. Exceeding their ripple limits tends to shorts and burning components.

For film and ceramic capacitors, normally specified with a loss factor tan δ, the ripple current limit is determined by temperature rise in the body of approximately 10 °C. Exceeding this limit may destroy the internal structure and cause shorts.

==== Pulse current ====
The rated pulse load for a certain capacitor is limited by the rated voltage, the pulse repetition frequency, temperature range and pulse rise time. The "pulse rise time" $dv/dt$, represents the steepest voltage gradient of the pulse (rise or fall time) and is expressed in volts per μs (V/μs).

The rated pulse rise time is also indirectly the maximum capacity of an applicable peak current $I_p$. The peak current is defined as:

$$I_p = C \cdot dv/dt$$

where: $I_p$ is in A; $C$ in μF; $dv/dt$ in V/μs

The permissible pulse current capacity of a metallized film capacitor generally allows an internal temperature rise of 8 to 10 K.

In the case of metallized film capacitors, pulse load depends on the properties of the dielectric material, the thickness of the metallization and the capacitor's construction, especially the construction of the contact areas between the end spray and metallized electrodes. High peak currents may lead to selective overheating of local contacts between end spray and metallized electrodes which may destroy some of the contacts, leading to increasing ESR.

For metallized film capacitors, so-called pulse tests simulate the pulse load that might occur during an application, according to a standard specification. IEC 60384 part 1, specifies that the test circuit is charged and discharged intermittently. The test voltage corresponds to the rated DC voltage and the test comprises 10000 pulses with a repetition frequency of 1 Hz. The pulse stress capacity is the pulse rise time. The rated pulse rise time is specified as 1/10 of the test pulse rise time.

The pulse load must be calculated for each application. A general rule for calculating the power handling of film capacitors is not available because of vendor-related internal construction details. To prevent the capacitor from overheating the following operating parameters have to be considered:

- peak current per μF
- Pulse rise or fall time dv/dt in V/μs
- relative duration of charge and discharge periods (pulse shape)
- maximum pulse voltage (peak voltage)
- peak reverse voltage;
- Repetition frequency of the pulse
- Ambient temperature
- Heat dissipation (cooling)

Higher pulse rise times are permitted for pulse voltage lower than the rated voltage.

Examples for calculations of individual pulse loads are given by many manufactures, e.g. WIMA and Kemet.

==== AC current ====
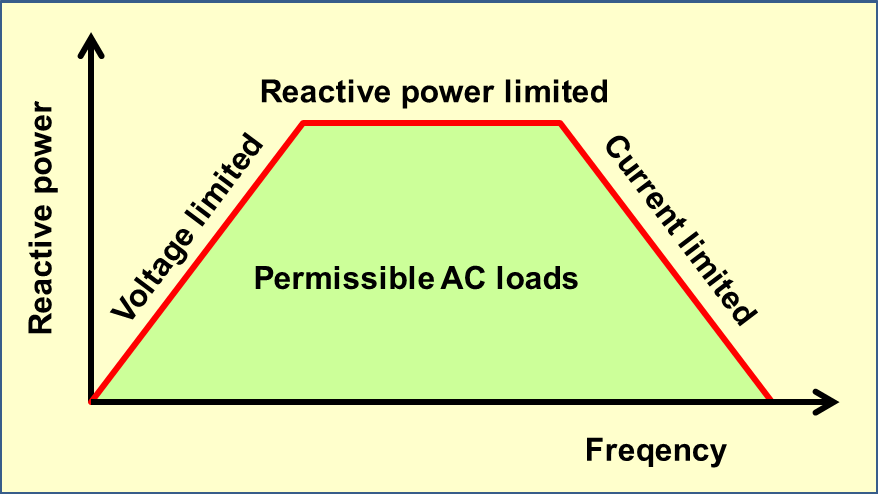
Limiting conditions for capacitors operating with AC loads

An AC load only can be applied to a non-polarized capacitor. Capacitors for AC applications are primarily film capacitors, metallized paper capacitors, ceramic capacitors and bipolar electrolytic capacitors.

The rated AC load for an AC capacitor is the maximum sinusoidal effective AC current (rms) which may be applied continuously to a capacitor within the specified temperature range. In the datasheets the AC load may be expressed as

- rated AC voltage at low frequencies,
- rated reactive power at intermediate frequencies,
- reduced AC voltage or rated AC current at high frequencies.

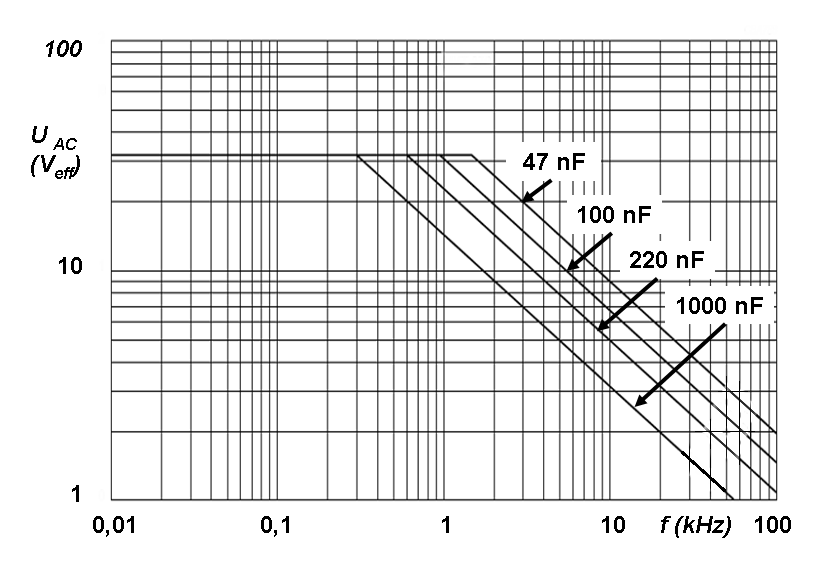
Typical rms AC voltage curves as a function of frequency, for 4 different capacitance values of a 63 V DC film capacitor series

The rated AC voltage for film capacitors is generally calculated so that an internal temperature rise of 8 to 10 K is the allowed limit for safe operation. Because dielectric losses increase with increasing frequency, the specified AC voltage has to be derated at higher frequencies. Datasheets for film capacitors specify special curves for derating AC voltages at higher frequencies.

If film capacitors or ceramic capacitors only have a DC specification, the peak value of the AC voltage applied has to be lower than the specified DC voltage.

AC loads can occur in AC motor run capacitors, for voltage doubling, in snubbers, lighting ballast and for PFC for phase shifting to improve transmission network stability and efficiency, which is one of the most important applications for large power capacitors. These mostly large PP film or metallized paper capacitors are limited by the rated reactive power VAr.

Bipolar electrolytic capacitors, to which an AC voltage may be applicable, are specified with a rated ripple current.

=== Insulation resistance and self-discharge constant ===
The resistance of the dielectric is finite, leading to some level of DC "leakage current" that causes a charged capacitor to lose charge over time. For ceramic and film capacitors, this resistance is called "insulation resistance R_{ins}". This resistance is represented by the resistor R_{ins} in parallel with the capacitor in the series-equivalent circuit of capacitors. Insulation resistance must not be confused with the outer isolation of the component with respect to the environment.

The time curve of self-discharge over insulation resistance with decreasing capacitor voltage follows the formula

$$u(t) = U_0 \cdot \mathrm{e}^{-t/\tau_\mathrm{s}},$$

With stored DC voltage $U_0$ and self-discharge constant

$$\tau_\mathrm{s} = R_\mathrm{ins} \cdot C$$

Thus, after $\tau_\mathrm{s}\,$ voltage $U_0$ drops to 37% of the initial value.

The self-discharge constant is an important parameter for the insulation of the dielectric between the electrodes of ceramic and film capacitors. For example, a capacitor can be used as the time-determining component for time relays or for storing a voltage value as in a sample and hold circuits or operational amplifiers.

Class 1 ceramic capacitors have an insulation resistance of at least 10 GΩ, while class 2 capacitors have at least 4 GΩ or a self-discharge constant of at least 100 s. Plastic film capacitors typically have an insulation resistance of 6 to 12 GΩ. This corresponds to capacitors in the uF range of a self-discharge constant of about 2000–4000 s.

Insulation resistance respectively the self-discharge constant can be reduced if humidity penetrates into the winding. It is partially strongly temperature dependent and decreases with increasing temperature. Both decrease with increasing temperature.

In electrolytic capacitors, the insulation resistance is defined as leakage current.

=== Leakage current ===
general leakage behavior of electrolytic capacitors: leakage current $I_{leak}$ as a function of time $t$ for different kinds of electrolytes non solid, high water content non solid, organic solid, polymer

For electrolytic capacitors the insulation resistance of the dielectric is termed "leakage current". This DC current is represented by the resistor R_{leak} in parallel with the capacitor in the series-equivalent circuit of electrolytic capacitors. This resistance between the terminals of a capacitor is also finite. R_{leak} is lower for electrolytics than for ceramic or film capacitors.

The leakage current includes all weak imperfections of the dielectric caused by unwanted chemical processes and mechanical damage. It is also the DC current that can pass through the dielectric after applying a voltage. It depends on the interval without voltage applied (storage time), the thermic stress from soldering, on voltage applied, on temperature of the capacitor, and on measuring time.

The leakage current drops in the first minutes after applying DC voltage. In this period the dielectric oxide layer can self-repair weaknesses by building up new layers. The time required depends generally on the electrolyte. Solid electrolytes drop faster than non-solid electrolytes but remain at a slightly higher level.

The leakage current in non-solid electrolytic capacitors as well as in manganese oxide solid tantalum capacitors decreases with voltage-connected time due to self-healing effects. Although electrolytics leakage current is higher than current flow over insulation resistance in ceramic or film capacitors, the self-discharge of modern non solid electrolytic capacitors takes several weeks.

A particular problem with electrolytic capacitors is storage time. Higher leakage current can be the result of longer storage times. These behaviors are limited to electrolytes with a high percentage of water. Organic solvents such as GBL do not have high leakage with longer storage times.

Leakage current is normally measured 2 or 5 minutes after applying rated voltage.

=== Microphonics ===
All ferroelectric materials exhibit a piezoelectric effect. Because Class 2 ceramic capacitors use ferroelectric ceramics dielectric, these types of capacitors may have electrical effects called microphonics. Microphonics (microphony) describes how electronic components transform mechanical vibrations into an undesired electrical signal (noise). The dielectric may absorb mechanical forces from shock or vibration by changing thickness and changing the electrode separation, affecting the capacitance, which in turn induces an AC current. The resulting interference is especially problematic in audio applications, potentially causing feedback or unintended recording.

In the reverse microphonic effect, varying the electric field between the capacitor plates exerts a physical force, turning them into an audio speaker. High current impulse loads or high ripple currents can generate audible sound from the capacitor itself, draining energy and stressing the dielectric.

=== Dielectric absorption (soakage) ===
Dielectric absorption occurs when a capacitor that has remained charged for a long time discharges only incompletely when briefly discharged. Although an ideal capacitor would reach zero volts after discharge, real capacitors develop a small voltage from time-delayed dipole discharging, a phenomenon that is also called dielectric relaxation, "soakage" or "battery action".

Values of dielectric absorption for some often used capacitors
Type of capacitor	Dielectric Absorption
Air and vacuum capacitors	Not measurable
Class-1 ceramic capacitors, NP0	0.6%
Class-2 ceramic capacitors, X7R	2.5%
Polypropylene film capacitors (PP)	0.05 to 0.1%
Polyester film capacitors (PET)	0.2 to 0.5%
Polyphenylene sulfide film capacitors (PPS)	0.05 to 0.1%
Polyethylene naphthalate film capacitors (PEN)	1.0 to 1.2%
Tantalum electrolytic capacitors with solid electrolyte	2 to 3%, 10%
Aluminium electrolytic capacitor with non solid electrolyte	10 to 15%
Double-layer capacitor or super capacitors	data not available

In many applications of capacitors dielectric absorption is not a problem but in some applications, such as long-time-constant integrators, sample-and-hold circuits, switched-capacitor analog-to-digital converters, and very low-distortion filters, the capacitor must not recover a residual charge after full discharge, so capacitors with low absorption are specified. The voltage at the terminals generated by the dielectric absorption may in some cases possibly cause problems in the function of an electronic circuit or can be a safety risk to personnel. In order to prevent shocks most very large capacitors are shipped with shorting wires that need to be removed before they are used.

=== Energy density ===
The capacitance value depends on the dielectric material (ε), the surface of the electrodes (A) and the distance (d) separating the electrodes and is given by the formula of a plate capacitor:

$$C \approx \frac{\varepsilon A}{d}$$

The separation of the electrodes and the voltage proof of the dielectric material defines the breakdown voltage of the capacitor. The breakdown voltage is proportional to the thickness of the dielectric.

Theoretically, given two capacitors with the same mechanical dimensions and dielectric, but one of them have half the thickness of the dielectric. With the same dimensions this one could place twice the parallel-plate area inside. This capacitor has theoretically 4 times the capacitance as the first capacitor but half of the voltage proof.

Since the energy density stored in a capacitor is given by:

$$E_\mathrm{stored} = \frac{1}{2} C V^2,$$

thus a capacitor having a dielectric half as thick as another has 4 times higher capacitance but 1/2 voltage proof, yielding an equal maximum energy density.

Therefore, dielectric thickness does not affect energy density within a capacitor of fixed overall dimensions. Using a few thick layers of dielectric can support a high voltage, but low capacitance, while thin layers of dielectric produce a low breakdown voltage, but a higher capacitance.

This assumes that neither the electrode surfaces nor the permittivity of the dielectric change with the voltage proof. A simple comparison with two existing capacitor series can show whether reality matches theory. The comparison is easy, because the manufacturers use standardized case sizes or boxes for different capacitance/voltage values within a series.

Comparison of energy stored in capacitors with the same dimensions but with different rated voltages and capacitance values
Electrolytic capacitors NCC, KME series Ǿ D × H = 16.5 mm × 25 mm		Metallized PP film capacitors KEMET; PHE 450 series W × H × L = 10.5 mm × 20.5 mm × 31.5 mm	
Capacitance/Voltage	Stored Energy	Capacitance/Voltage	Stored Energy
4700 μF/10 V	235 mW·s	1.2 μF/250 V	37.5 mW·s
2200 μF/25 V	688 mW·s	0.68 μF/400 V	54.4 mW·s
220 μF/100 V	1100 mW·s	0.39 μF/630 V	77.4 mW·s
22 μF/400 V	1760 mW·s	0.27 μF/1000 V	135 mW·s

In reality modern capacitor series do not fit the theory. For electrolytic capacitors the sponge-like rough surface of the anode foil gets smoother with higher voltages, decreasing the surface area of the anode. But because the energy increases squared with the voltage, and the surface of the anode decreases lesser than the voltage proof, the energy density increases clearly. For film capacitors the permittivity changes with dielectric thickness and other mechanical parameters so that the deviation from the theory has other reasons.

Comparing the capacitors from the table with a supercapacitor, the highest energy density capacitor family. For this, the capacitor 25 F/2.3 V in dimensions D × H = 16 mm × 26 mm from Maxwell HC Series, compared with the electrolytic capacitor of approximately equal size in the table. This supercapacitor has roughly 5000 times higher capacitance than the 4700/10 electrolytic capacitor but 1/4 of the voltage and has about 66,000 mWs (0.018 Wh) stored electrical energy, approximately 100 times higher energy density (40 to 280 times) than the electrolytic capacitor.

=== Long time behavior, aging ===
Electrical parameters of capacitors may change over time during storage and application. The reasons for parameter changings are different, it may be a property of the dielectric, environmental influences, chemical processes or drying-out effects for non-solid materials.

==== Aging ====
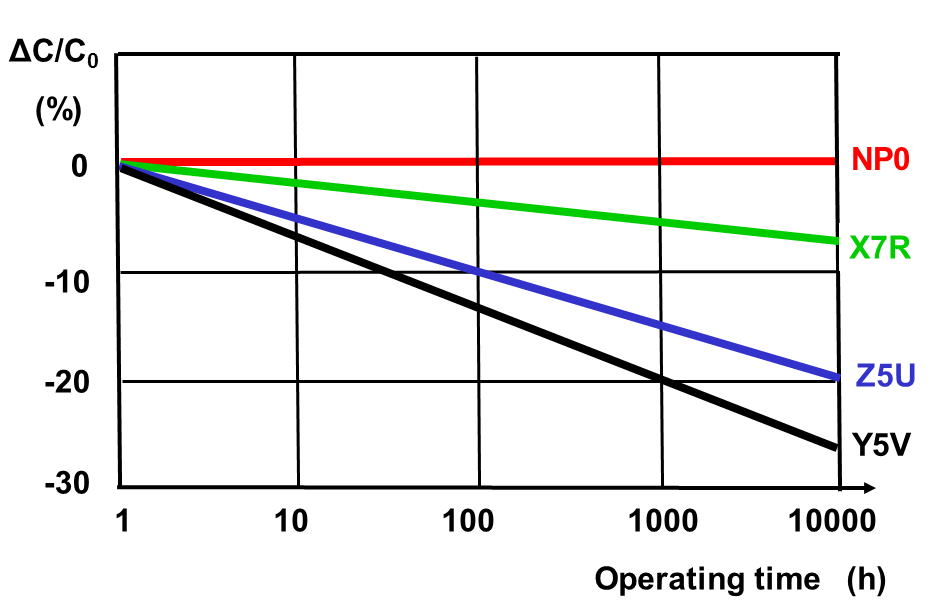
Aging of different Class 2 ceramic capacitors compared with NP0-Class 1 ceramic capacitor

In ferroelectric Class 2 ceramic capacitors, capacitance decreases over time. This behavior is called "aging". This aging occurs in ferroelectric dielectrics, where domains of polarization in the dielectric contribute to the total polarization. Degradation of polarized domains in the dielectric decreases permittivity and therefore capacitance over time. The aging follows a logarithmic law. This defines the decrease of capacitance as constant percentage for a time decade after the soldering recovery time at a defined temperature, for example, in the period from 1 to 10 hours at 20 °C. As the law is logarithmic, the percentage loss of capacitance will twice between 1 h and 100 h and 3 times between 1 h and 1,000 h and so on. Aging is fastest near the beginning, and the absolute capacitance value stabilizes over time.

The rate of aging of Class 2 ceramic capacitors depends mainly on its materials. Generally, the higher the temperature dependence of the ceramic, the higher the aging percentage. The typical aging of X7R ceramic capacitors is about 2.5% per decade. The aging rate of Z5U ceramic capacitors is significantly higher and can be up to 7% per decade.

The aging process of Class 2 ceramic capacitors may be reversed by heating the component above the Curie point.

Class 1 ceramic capacitors and film capacitors do not have ferroelectric-related aging. Environmental influences such as higher temperature, high humidity and mechanical stress can, over a longer period, lead to a small irreversible change in the capacitance value sometimes called aging, too.

The change of capacitance for P 100 and N 470 Class 1 ceramic capacitors is lower than 1%, for capacitors with N 750 to N 1500 ceramics it is ≤ 2%. Film capacitors may lose capacitance due to self-healing processes or gain it due to humidity influences. Typical changes over 2 years at 40 °C are, for example, ±3% for PE film capacitors and ±1% PP film capacitors.

==== Life time ====
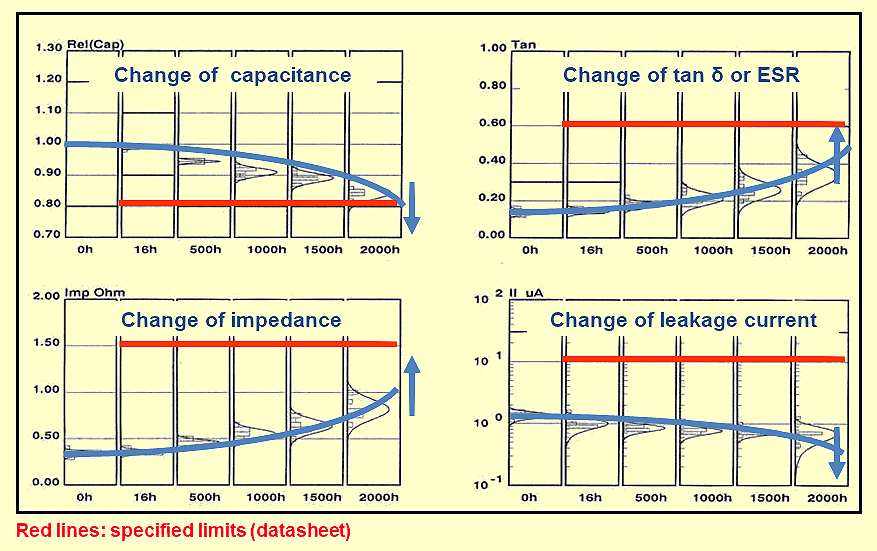
The electrical values of electrolytic capacitors with non-solid electrolyte changes over the time due to evaporation of electrolyte. Reaching specified limits of the parameters the capacitors will be count as "wear out failure".

Electrolytic capacitors with non-solid electrolyte age as the electrolyte evaporates. This evaporation depends on temperature and the current load the capacitors experience. Electrolyte escape influences capacitance and ESR. Capacitance decreases and the ESR increases over time. In contrast to ceramic, film and electrolytic capacitors with solid electrolytes, "wet" electrolytic capacitors reach a specified "end of life" reaching a specified maximum change of capacitance or ESR. End of life, "load life" or "lifetime" can be estimated either by formula or diagrams or roughly by a so-called "10-degree-law". A typical specification for an electrolytic capacitor states a lifetime of 2,000 hours at 85 °C, doubling for every 10 degrees lower temperature, achieving lifespan of approximately 15 years at room temperature.

Supercapacitors also experience electrolyte evaporation over time. Estimation is similar to wet electrolytic capacitors. Additional to temperature the voltage and current load influence the life time. Lower voltage than rated voltage and lower current loads as well as lower temperature extend the life time.

=== Failure rate ===
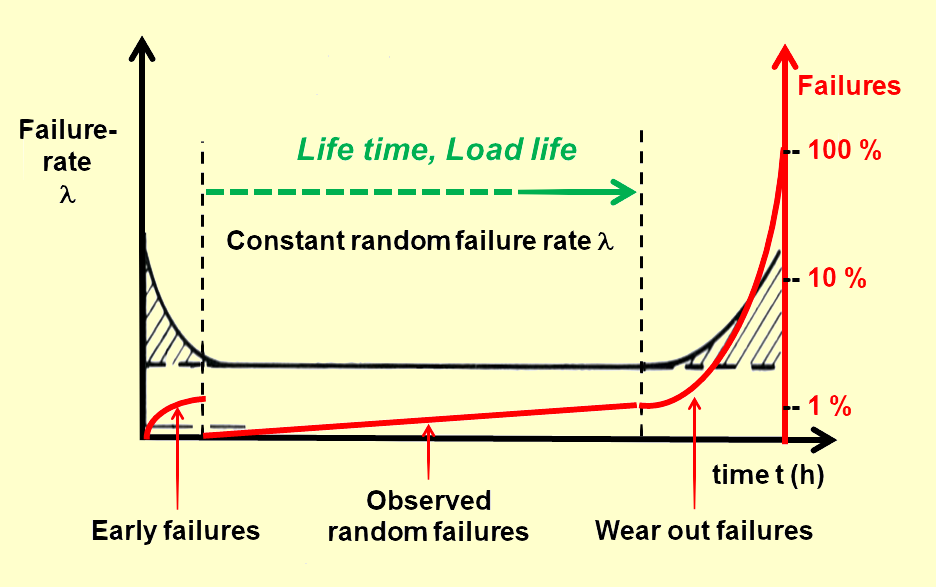
The life time (load life) of capacitors correspondents with the time of constant random failure rate shown in the bathtub curve. For electrolytic capacitors with non-solid electrolyte and supercapacitors ends this time with the beginning of wear out failures due to evaporation of electrolyte

Capacitors are reliable components with low failure rates, achieving life expectancies of decades under normal conditions. Most capacitors pass a test at the end of production similar to a "burn in", so that early failures are found during production, reducing the number of post-shipment failures.

Reliability for capacitors is usually specified in numbers of Failures In Time (FIT) during the period of constant random failures. FIT is the number of failures that can be expected in one billion component-hours of operation at fixed working conditions (e.g. 1000 devices for 1 million hours, or 1 million devices for 1000 hours each, at 40 °C and 0.5 U_{R}). For other conditions of applied voltage, current load, temperature, mechanical influences and humidity the FIT can recalculated with terms standardized for industrial or military contexts.

== Additional information ==
=== Soldering ===
Capacitors may experience changes to electrical parameters due to environmental influences like soldering, mechanical stress factors (vibration, shock) and humidity. The greatest stress factor is soldering. The heat of the solder bath, especially for SMD capacitors, can cause ceramic capacitors to change contact resistance between terminals and electrodes; in film capacitors, the film may shrink, and in wet electrolytic capacitors the electrolyte may boil. A recovery period enables characteristics to stabilize after soldering; some types may require up to 24 hours. Some properties may change irreversibly by a few per cent from soldering.

=== Electrolytic behavior from storage or disuse ===
Electrolytic capacitors with non-solid electrolyte are "aged" during manufacturing by applying rated voltage at high temperature for a sufficient time to repair all cracks and weaknesses that may have occurred during production. Some electrolytes with a high water content react quite aggressively or even violently with unprotected aluminum. This leads to a "storage" or "disuse" problem of electrolytic capacitors manufactured before the 1980s. Chemical processes weaken the oxide layer when these capacitors are not used for too long, leading to failure or poor performance such as excessive leakage. New electrolytes with "inhibitors" or "passivators" were developed during the 1980s to lessen this problem.

"Pre-conditioning" may be recommended for electrolytic capacitors with non-solid electrolyte, even those manufactured recently, that have not been in use for an extended period. In pre-conditioning a voltage is applied across the capacitor and a deliberately limited current is passed through the capacitor. Sending a limited current through the capacitor repairs oxide layers damaged during the period of disuse. The applied voltage is lower than or equal to the capacitor's rated voltage. Current may be limited using, for instance, a series resistor. Pre-conditioning is stopped once leakage current is below some acceptable level at the desired voltage. As of 2015 one manufacturer indicates that pre-conditioning may be usefully carried out for capacitors with non-solid electrolytes that have been in storage for more than 1 to 10 years, the maximum storage time depending on capacitor type.

=== IEC/EN standards ===
The tests and requirements to be met by capacitors for use in electronic equipment for approval as standardized types are set out in the generic specification IEC/EN 60384–1 in the following sections.

Generic specification

- IEC/EN 60384-1—Fixed capacitors for use in electronic equipment

Ceramic capacitors

- IEC/EN 60384-8—Fixed capacitors of ceramic dielectric, Class 1
- IEC/EN 60384-9—Fixed capacitors of ceramic dielectric, Class 2
- IEC/EN 60384-21—Fixed surface mount multilayer capacitors of ceramic dielectric, Class 1
- IEC/EN 60384-22—Fixed surface mount multilayer capacitors of ceramic dielectric, Class 2

Film capacitors

- IEC/EN 60384-2—Fixed metallized polyethylene-terephthalate film dielectric d.c. capacitors
- IEC/EN 60384-11—Fixed polyethylene-terephthalate film dielectric metal foil d.c. capacitors
- IEC/EN 60384-13—Fixed polypropylene film dielectric metal foil d.c. capacitors
- IEC/EN 60384-16—Fixed metallized polypropylene film dielectric d.c. capacitors
- IEC/EN 60384-17—Fixed metallized polypropylene film dielectric a.c. and pulse
- IEC/EN 60384-19—Fixed metallized polyethylene-terephthalate film dielectric surface mount d.c. capacitors
- IEC/EN 60384-20—Fixed metallized polyphenylene sulfide film dielectric surface mount d.c. capacitors
- IEC/EN 60384-23—Fixed metallized polyethylene naphthalate film dielectric chip d.c. capacitors

Electrolytic capacitors

- IEC/EN 60384-3—Surface mount fixed tantalum electrolytic capacitors with manganese dioxide solid electrolyte
- IEC/EN 60384-4—Aluminium electrolytic capacitors with solid (MnO2) and non-solid electrolyte
- IEC/EN 60384-15—Fixed tantalum capacitors with non-solid and solid electrolyte
- IEC/EN 60384-18—Fixed aluminium electrolytic surface mount capacitors with solid (MnO_{2}) and non-solid electrolyte
- IEC/EN 60384-24—Surface mount fixed tantalum electrolytic capacitors with conductive polymer solid electrolyte
- IEC/EN 60384-25—Surface mount fixed aluminium electrolytic capacitors with conductive polymer solid electrolyte
- IEC/EN 60384-26—Fixed aluminium electrolytic capacitors with conductive polymer solid electrolyte

Supercapacitors

- IEC/EN 62391-1—Fixed electric double-layer capacitors for use in electric and electronic equipment – Part 1: Generic specification
- IEC/EN 62391-2—Fixed electric double-layer capacitors for use in electronic equipment – Part 2: Sectional specification – Electric double-layer capacitors for power application

=== Capacitor symbols ===
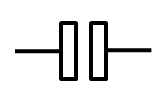
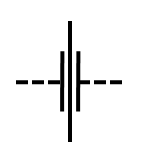
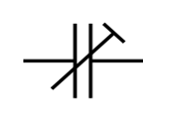
Capacitor	Polarized capacitor Electrolytic capacitor	Bipolar electrolytic capacitor	Feed through capacitor	Trimmer capacitor	Variable capacitor

Capacitor symbols

=== Markings ===
==== Imprinted ====
Capacitors, like most other electronic components and if enough space is available, have imprinted markings to indicate manufacturer, type, electrical and thermal characteristics, and date of manufacture. If they are large enough the capacitor is marked with:

- manufacturer's name or trademark;
- manufacturer's type designation;
- polarity of the terminations (for polarized capacitors)
- rated capacitance;
- tolerance on rated capacitance
- rated voltage and nature of supply (AC or DC)
- climatic category or rated temperature;
- year and month (or week) of manufacture;
- certification marks of safety standards (for safety EMI/RFI suppression capacitors)

Polarized capacitors have polarity markings, usually "−" (minus) sign on the side of the negative electrode for electrolytic capacitors or a stripe or "+" (plus) sign, see #Polarity marking. Also, the negative lead for leaded "wet" e-caps is usually shorter.

Smaller capacitors use a shorthand notation. The most commonly used format is: XYZ J/K/M VOLTS V, where XYZ represents the capacitance (calculated as XY × 10^{Z} pF), the letters J, K or M indicate the tolerance (±5%, ±10% and ±20% respectively) and VOLTS V represents the working voltage.

Examples:

- 105K 330 V implies a capacitance of 10 × 10^{5} pF = 1 μF (K = ±10%) with a working voltage of 330 V.
- 473M 100 V implies a capacitance of 47 × 10^{3} pF = 47 nF (M = ±20%) with a working voltage of 100 V.

Capacitance, tolerance and date of manufacture can be indicated with a short code specified in IEC/EN 60062. Examples of short-marking of the rated capacitance (microfarads): μ47 = 0.47 μF, 4μ7 = 4.7 μF, 47μ = 47 μF

The date of manufacture is often printed in accordance with international standards.

- Version 1: coding with year/week numeral code, "1208" is "2012, week number 8".
- Version 2: coding with year code/month code. The year codes are: "R" = 2003, "S"= 2004, "T" = 2005, "U" = 2006, "V" = 2007, "W" = 2008, "X" = 2009, "A" = 2010, "B" = 2011, "C" = 2012, "D" = 2013, etc. Month codes are: "1" to "9" = Jan. to Sept., "O" = October, "N" = November, "D" = December. "X5" is then "2009, May"

For very small capacitors like MLCC chips no marking is possible. Here only the traceability of the manufacturers can ensure the identification of a type.

==== Colour coding ====
As of 2013 Capacitors do not use color coding.

=== Polarity marking ===
Polarity marking

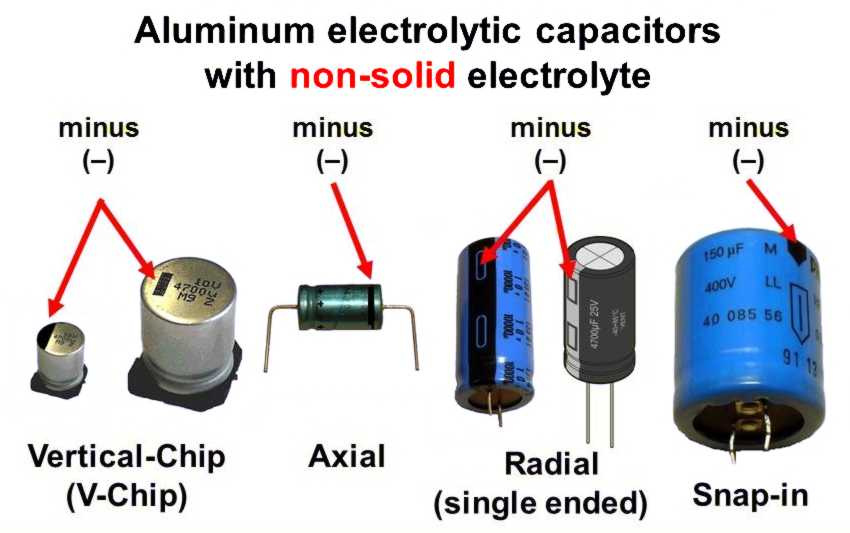

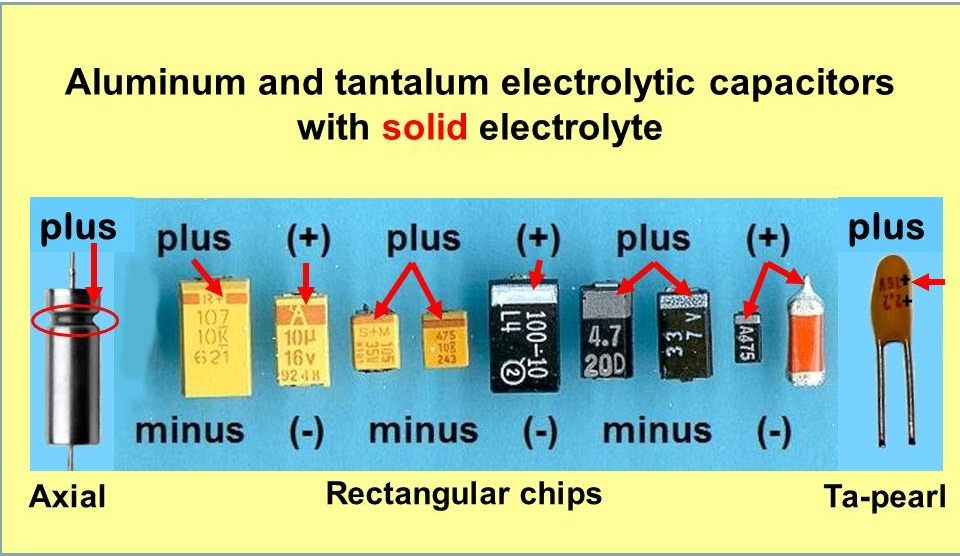

Aluminum e-caps with non-solid electrolyte have a polarity marking at the cathode (minus) side. Aluminum, tantalum, and niobium e-caps with solid electrolyte have a polarity marking at the anode (plus) side. Supercapacitors are marked at the minus side.

Polarity marking details
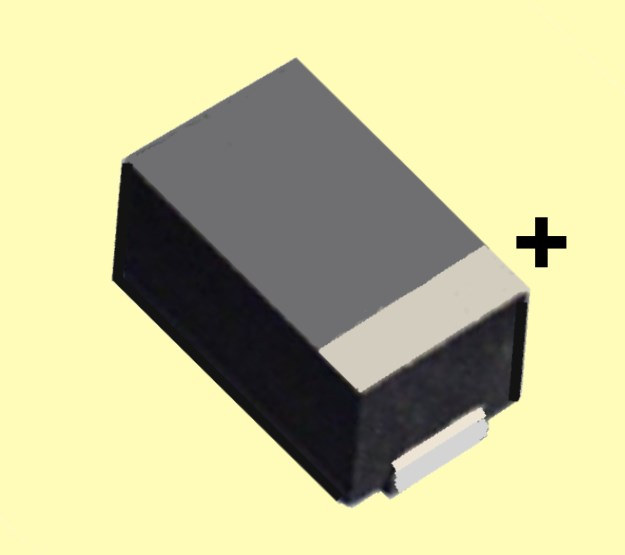
Rectangular polymer capacitors, tantalum as well as aluminum, have a polarity marking at the anode (plus) side

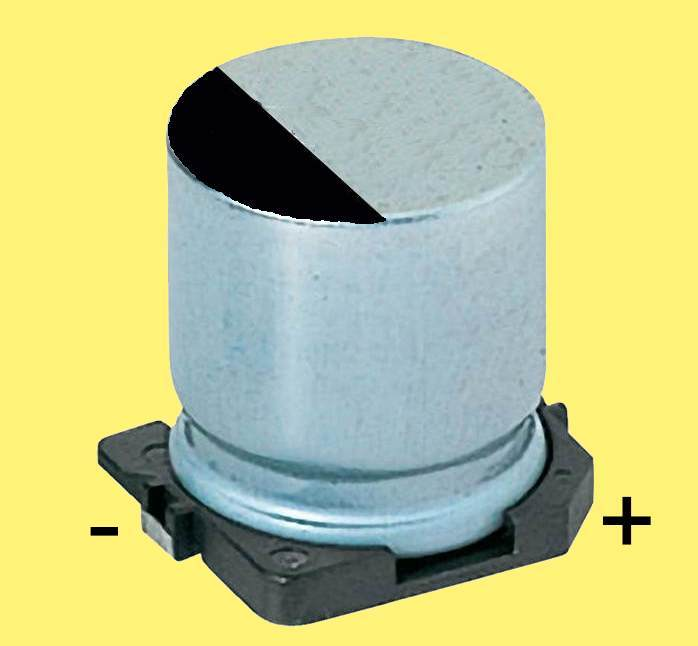
Cylindrical polymer capacitors have a polarity marking at the cathode (minus) side

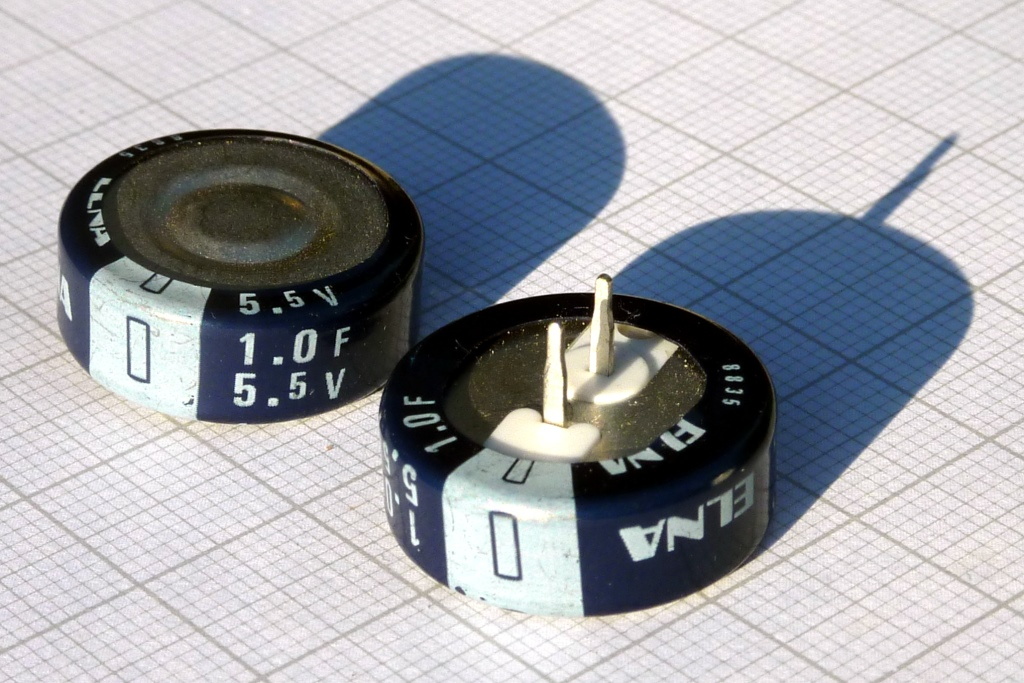
Supercapacitors are marked at the cathode (minus) side

== Market segments ==
Discrete capacitors today are industrial products produced in very large quantities for use in electronic and in electrical equipment. Globally, the market for fixed capacitors was estimated at US$18 billion in 2008 for 1.4 trillion pieces. This market is dominated by ceramic capacitors with estimate of approximately one trillion items per year.

Detailed estimated figures in value for the main capacitor families are:

- Ceramic capacitors—US$8.3 billion (46%);
- Aluminum electrolytic capacitors—US$3.9 billion (22%);
- Film capacitors and Paper capacitors—US$2.6 billion, (15%);
- Tantalum electrolytic capacitors—US$2.2 billion (12%);
- Super capacitors (Double-layer capacitors)—US$0.3 billion (2%); and
- Others like silver mica and vacuum capacitors—US$0.7 billion (3%).

All other capacitor types are negligible in terms of value and quantity compared with the above types.

== See also ==
- Circuit design
- Decoupling capacitor
- List of capacitor manufacturers
