= Block capacitor =

Block capacitor may refer to:

- DC-blocking capacitor also known as coupling capacitor
- a misnomer for a decoupling, reservoir or smoothing capacitor, possibly due to the German term Blockkondensator
