= OSCON =

OSCON may refer to:

- OS-CON, a type of electronic capacitor
- O'Reilly Open Source Convention
- Oscon (Open Source CONtract), the most used open-contract in Italy.
