= Polymer capacitor =

Solid conductive electrolyte

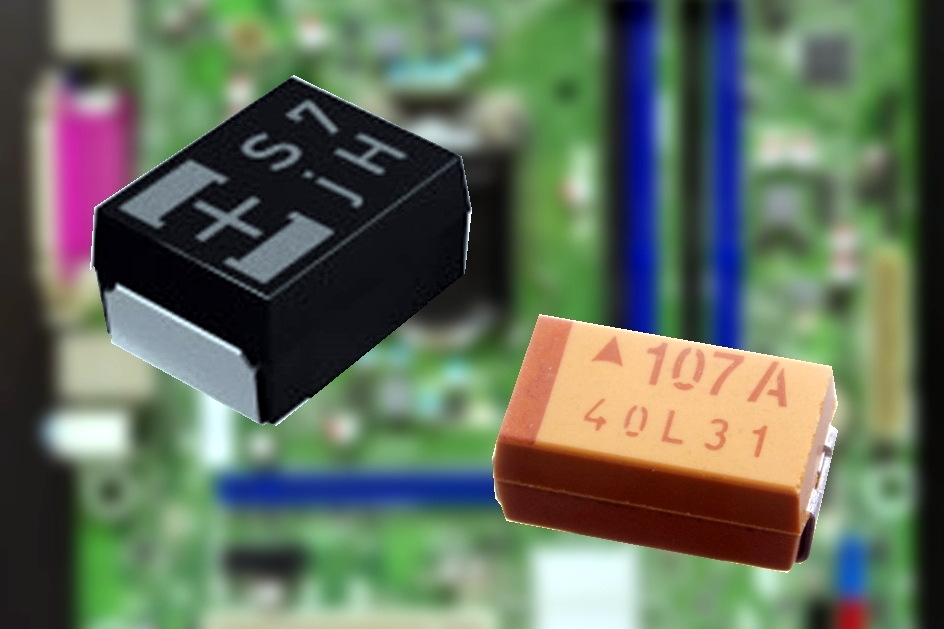
Rectangular shaped polymer aluminium (black) and tantalum (brown) electrolytic chip capacitors

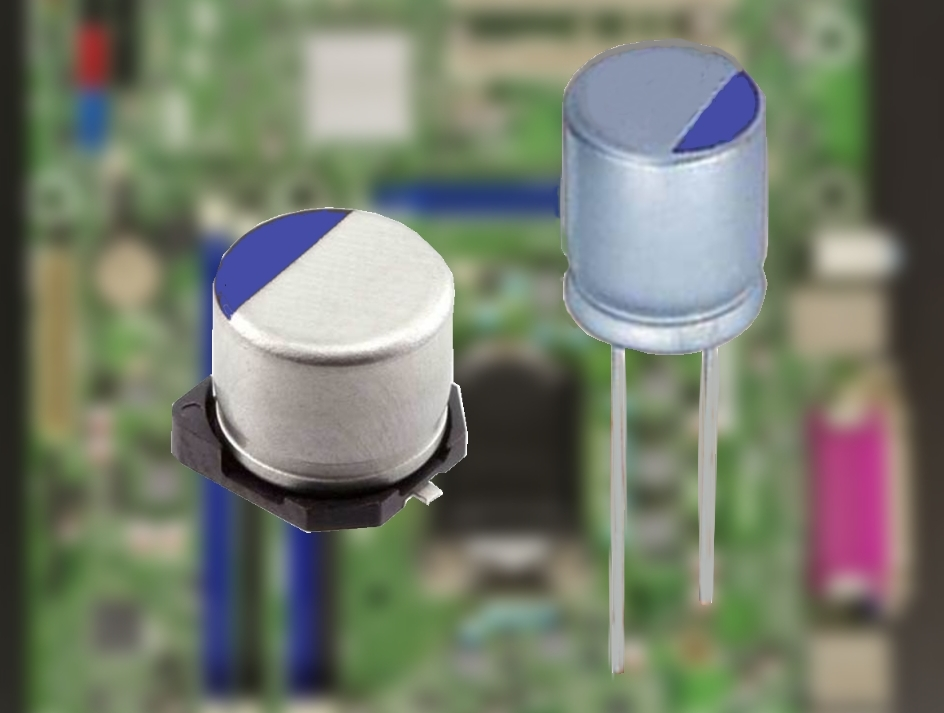
Cylindrical (wound) polymer aluminium electrolytic capacitors

A polymer capacitor, or more accurately a polymer electrolytic capacitor, is an electrolytic capacitor (e-cap) with a solid conductive polymer electrolyte. There are four different types:

- Polymer tantalum electrolytic capacitor (Polymer Ta-e-cap)
- Polymer aluminium electrolytic capacitor (Polymer Al-e-cap)
- Hybrid polymer capacitor (Hybrid polymer Al-e-cap)
- Polymer niobium electrolytic capacitors

Polymer Ta-e-caps are available in rectangular surface-mounted device (SMD) chip style. Polymer Al-e-caps and hybrid polymer Al-e-caps are available in rectangular surface-mounted device (SMD) chip style, in cylindrical SMDs (V-chips) style or as radial leaded versions (single-ended).

Polymer electrolytic capacitors are characterized by particularly low internal equivalent series resistances (ESR) and high ripple current ratings. Their electrical parameters have similar temperature dependence, reliability and service life compared to solid tantalum capacitors, but have a much better temperature dependence and a considerably longer service life than aluminium electrolytic capacitors with non-solid electrolytes. In general polymer e-caps have a higher leakage current rating than the other solid or non-solid electrolytic capacitors.

Polymer electrolytic capacitors are also available in a hybrid construction. The hybrid polymer aluminium electrolytic capacitors combine a solid polymer electrolyte with a liquid electrolyte. These types are characterized by low ESR values but have low leakage currents and are insensitive to transients, however they have a temperature-dependent service life similar to non-solid e-caps.

Polymer electrolytic capacitors are mainly used in power supplies of integrated electronic circuits as buffer, bypass and decoupling capacitors, especially in devices with flat or compact design. Thus they compete with MLCC capacitors, but offer higher capacitance values than MLCC, and they display no microphonic effect (such as class 2 and 3 ceramic capacitors).

== History ==
Aluminium electrolytic capacitors (Al-e-caps) with liquid electrolytes were invented in 1896 by Charles Pollak.

Tantalum electrolytic capacitors with solid manganese dioxide (MnO_{2}) electrolytes were invented by Bell Laboratories in the early 1950s, as a miniaturized and more reliable low-voltage support capacitor to complement the newly invented transistor, see Tantalum capacitor. The first Ta-e-caps with MnO_{2} electrolytes had 10 times better conductivity and a higher ripple current load than earlier types Al-e-caps with liquid electrolyte. Additionally, unlike standard Al-e-caps, the equivalent series resistance (ESR) of Ta-caps is stable in varying temperatures.

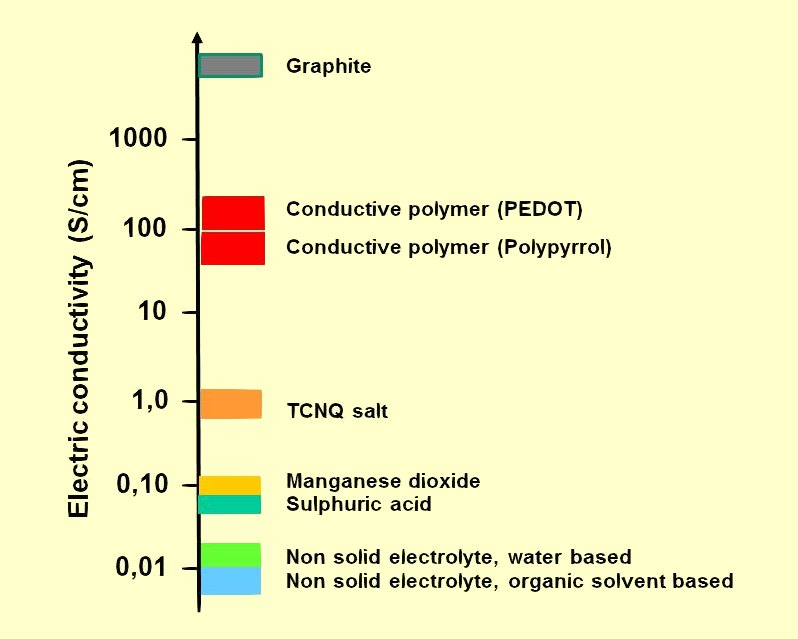
Conductivities of some electrolytes

During the 1970s, the increasing digitization of electronic circuits came with decreasing operating voltages, and increasing switching frequencies and ripple current loads. This had consequences for power supplies and their electrolytic capacitors. Capacitors with lower ESR and lower equivalent series inductance (ESL) for bypass and decoupling capacitors used in power supply lines were needed. see Role of ESR, ESL and capacitance.

A breakthrough came in 1973, with the discovery by A. Heeger and F. Wudl of an organic conductor, the charge-transfer salt TCNQ. TCNQ (7,7,8,8-tetracyanoquinodimethane or N-n-butyl isoquinolinium in combination with TTF (Tetrathiafulvalene)) is a chain molecule of almost perfect one-dimensional structure that has a 10-fold better conductivity along the chains than does MnO_{2}, and has a 100-fold better conductivity than non-solid electrolytes.

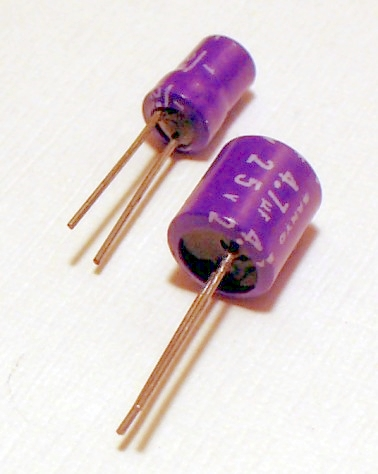
OS-CON capacitors with solid TCNQ electrolyte had a typical lilac insulation sleeve

The first Al-e-caps to use the charge transfer salt TTF-TCNQ as a solid organic electrolyte was the OS-CON series offered in 1983 from Sanyo. These were wound, cylindrical capacitors with 10x increased electrolyte conductivity compared with MnO_{2}

These capacitors were used in devices for applications that required the lowest possible ESR or highest possible ripple current. One OS-CON e-cap could replace three more bulky "wet" e-caps or two Ta-caps. By 1995, the Sanyo OS-CON became the preferred decoupling capacitor for Pentium processor-based IBM personal computers. The Sanyo OS-CON e-cap product line was sold in 2010 to Panasonic. Panasonic then replaced the TCNQ salt with a conducting polymer under the same brand.

The next step in ESR reduction was the development of conducting polymers by Alan J. Heeger, Alan MacDiarmid and Hideki Shirakawa in 1975. The conductivity of conductive polymers such as polypyrrole (PPy) or PEDOT is better than that of TCNQ by a factor of 100 to 500, and close to the conductivity of metals.

In 1988 the first polymer electrolyte e-cap, "APYCAP" with PPy polymer electrolyte, was launched by the Japanese manufacturer Nitsuko. The product was not successful, in part because it was not available in SMD versions.

In 1991 Panasonic launched its polymer Al-e-cap series "SP-Cap", These e-caps used PPy polymer electrolyte and reached ESR values that were directly comparable to ceramic multilayer capacitors (MLCCs). They were still less expensive than tantalum capacitors and with their flat design useful in compact devices such as laptops and cell phones they competed with tantalum chip capacitors as well.

Tantalum electrolytic capacitors with PPy polymer electrolyte cathode followed three years later. In 1993 NEC introduced its SMD polymer Ta-e-caps called "NeoCap". In 1997 Sanyo followed with the "POSCAP" polymer tantalum chips.

A new conductive polymer for tantalum polymer capacitors was presented by Kemet at the "1999 Carts" conference. This capacitor used the newly developed organic conductive polymer PEDT (Poly(3,4-ethylenedioxythiophene)), also known as PEDOT (trade name Baytron®).

Two years later at the 2001 APEC Conference, Kemet introduced PEDOT polymer aluminium e-caps to the market. PEDOT polymer has a higher temperature stability, and as PEDOT:PSS solution this electrolyte could be inserted only by dipping instead of in-situ polymerization like for PPy which makes the production faster and cheaper. Its AO-Cap series included SMD capacitors with stacked anode in "D" size with heights from 1.0 to 4.0 mm, in competition to the Panasonic SP-Caps using PPy at that time.

Around the turn of the millennium hybrid polymer capacitors were developed, which have in addition to the solid polymer electrolyte a liquid electrolyte connecting the polymer layers covering the dielectric layer on the anode and the cathode foil. The non-solid electrolyte provide oxygen for self-healing purposes to reduce the leakage current. In 2001, NIC launched a hybrid polymer e-cap to replace a polymer type at lower price and with lower leakage current. As of 2016 hybrid polymer capacitors are available from multiple manufacturers.

== Application basics ==
=== Role of ESR, ESL and capacitance ===
The predominant application of all electrolytic capacitors is in power supplies. They are used in input and output smoothing capacitors, as decoupling capacitors to circulate the harmonic current in a short loop, as bypass capacitors to shunt AC noise to the ground by bypassing the power supply lines, as backup capacitors to mitigate the drop in line voltage during sudden power demand or as filter capacitor in low-pass filter to reduce switching noises. In these applications, in addition to the size, are the capacitance, the impedance Z, the ESR, and the inductance ESL important electrical characteristics for the functionality of these capacitors in the circuits.

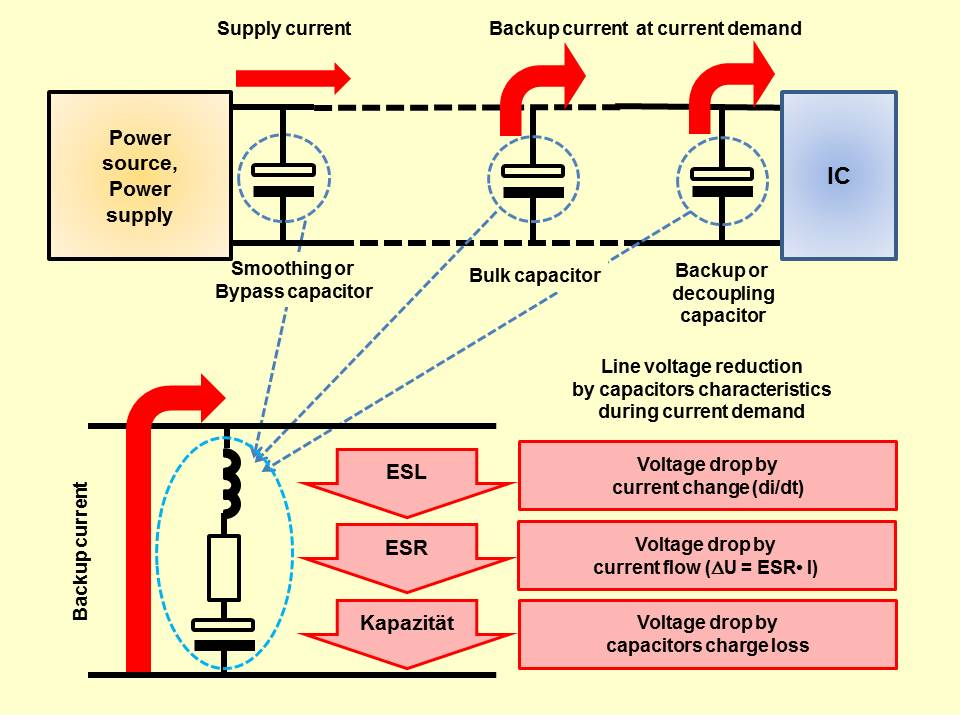
For a sudden power demand of a subsequent circuit, the supply voltage drops by ESL, ESR and capacitance charge loss

The change to digital electronic equipment led to the development of switching power supplies with higher frequencies and "on-board" DC/DC converter, lower supply voltages and higher supply currents. Capacitors for this applications needed lower ESR values, which at that time with Al-e-caps could only be realized with larger case sizes or by replacement with much more expensive solid Ta-caps.

The reason how the ESR influences the functionality of an integrated circuit is simple. If the circuit (e.g. a microprocessor) has a sudden power demand, the supply voltage drops by ESL, ESR and capacitance charge loss. Because in case of a sudden current demand the voltage of the power line drops:

ΔU = ESR × I.

For example:

Given a supply voltage of 3 V, with a tolerance of 10% (300 mV) and supply current of a maximum of 10 A, a sudden power demand drops the voltage by

ESR = U/I = (0.3 V)/(10 A) = 30 mΩ.

This means that the ESR in a CPU power supply must be less than 30 mΩ, otherwise the circuit malfunctions. Similar rules are valid for capacitance and ESL. The specific capacitance could be increased over the years by higher etched anode foils respectively by smaller and finer tantalum powder grains by a factor of 10 to 15 and could follow the trend of miniaturizing. The ESL challenge has led to the stacked foil versions of polymer Al e-caps. However, for lowering the ESR only the development of new, solid conductive materials, first TCNQ, after that the conductive polymers, which led to the development of the polymer electrolyte capacitors with their very low ESR values, the ESR challenge of digitization of electronic circuits could be accepted.

== Electrolytic capacitors – basics ==
=== Anodic oxidation ===
Basic principle of anodic oxidation (forming), in which, by applying a voltage with a current source, an oxide layer is formed on a metallic anode

Electrolytic capacitors use a chemical feature of some special metals, earlier called "valve metals", that by anodic oxidation form an insulating oxide layer. By applying a positive voltage to the anode (+) material in an electrolytic bath an oxide barrier layer with a thickness corresponding to the applied voltage can be formed. This oxide layer acts as the dielectric in an e-cap. To increase the capacitors capacitance the anode surface is roughened and so the oxide layer surface also is roughened. To complete a capacitor a counter electrode has to match the rough insulating oxide surface. This is accomplished by the electrolyte, which acts as the cathode (-) electrode of an electrolytic capacitor. The main difference between the polymer capacitors is the anode material and its oxide used as the dielectric:

- Polymer tantalum electrolytic capacitors use high purity sintered tantalum powder as an anode with tantalum pentoxide (Ta_{2}O_{5}) as a dielectric and
- Polymer aluminium electrolytic capacitors use a high purity and electrochemically etched (roughened) aluminium foil as an anode with aluminium oxide (Al_{2}O_{3}) as the dielectric

The properties of the aluminium oxide layer compared with tantalum pentoxide dielectric layer are given in the following table:

Characteristics of the different oxide layers in aluminium, tantalum and niobium electrolytic capacitors
Anode- material	Dielectric	Oxide structure	Relative permittivity	Breakdown voltage (V/μm)	Electric layer thickness (nm/V)
Tantalum	Tantalum pentoxide Ta_{2}O_{5}	amorphous	27	625	1.6
Aluminum	Aluminium oxide Al_{2}O_{3}	amorphous	9.6	710	1.4
Aluminum	Aluminium oxide Al_{2}O_{3}	crystalline	11.6...14.2	800...1000	1.25...1.0

A dielectric material is placed between two conducting plates (electrodes), each of area A, and with a separation of d.

Every e-cap in principle forms a "plate capacitor" whose capacitance is an increasing function of the electrode area A, the permittivity ε of the dielectric material and the thickness of the dielectric (d).

$$C = \varepsilon \cdot \frac{A}{d}$$

Capacitance is proportional to the product of the area of one plate multiplied by the permittivity and divided by the dielectric thickness.

The dielectric thickness is in the range of nanometers per volt. On the other hand, the breakdown voltage of these oxide layers is quite high. Using etched or sintered anodes, with their much higher surface area compared to a smooth surface of the same size or volume, e-caps can achieve a high volumetric capacitance. The latest developments in high etched or sintered anodes increases the capacitance value, depending on the rated voltage, by a factor of up to 200 for Al-e-caps or Ta-e-caps compared with smooth anodes.

Because the forming voltage defines the oxide thickness, the desired voltage tolerance can be easily produced. Therefore, the volume of a capacitor is defined by the product of capacitance and voltage, the so-called "CV product".

Comparing the dielectric constants of tantalum and aluminium oxides, Ta_{2}O_{5} has permittivity approximately 3-fold higher than Al_{2}O_{3}. Ta-caps therefore theoretically can be smaller than Al-caps with the same capacitance and rated voltage. For real tantalum electrolytic capacitors, the oxide layer thicknesses are much thicker than the rated voltage of the capacitor actually requires. This is done for safety reasons to avoid shorts coming from field crystallization. For this reason the real differences of sizes that derive from the different permittivities, are partially ineffective.

=== Electrolytes ===
The most important electrical property of an electrolyte in an electrolytic capacitor is its electrical conductivity. The electrolyte forms the counter electrode, of the e-cap, the cathode. The roughened structures of the anode surface continue in the structure of the oxide layer, the dielectric, the cathode must adapt precisely to the roughened structure. With a liquid, as in the conventional "wet" e-caps that is easy to achieve. In polymer e-caps in which a solid conductive polymer forms the electrolyte, this is much more difficult to achieve, because its conductivity comes by a chemical process of polymerization. However, the benefits of a solid polymer electrolyte, the significantly lower ESR of the capacitor and the low temperature dependence of the electrical parameters, in many cases justify the additional production steps as well as higher costs.

==== Conducting salt TCNQ electrolyte ====
Structural formula of TCNQ

Electrolytic capacitors with the charge transfer salt tetracyanoquinodimethane TCNQ as electrolyte, formerly produced by Sanyo with the trade name "OS-CON", in the true sense of the term "polymer" were not "polymer capacitors". TCNQ electrolytic capacitors are mentioned here to point out the danger of confusion with 'real' polymer capacitors, which are sold nowadays under the same trade name OS-CON. The original OS-CON capacitors with TCNQ electrolyte sold by the former manufacturer Sanyo has been discontinued with the integration of Sanyo capacitor businesses by Panasonic 2010. Panasonic keep the trade name OS-CON but change the TCNQ electrolyte into a conductive polymer electrolyte (PPy).

Electrolytic capacitors with TCNQ electrolyte are not available anymore.

==== Polymer electrolyte ====
Polymers are formed by a chemical reaction, polymerization. In this reaction monomers are continuously attached to a growing polymer strand. Usually polymers are electrically insulators, at best, semiconductors. For use as an electrolyte in e-caps, electrical conductive polymers are employed. The conductivity of a polymer is obtained by conjugated double bonds which permit free movement of charge carriers in the doped state. As charge carriers serve electron holes. That means, the conductivity of conducting polymers, which is nearly comparable with metallic conductors, only starts when the polymers are doped oxidatively or reductively.

A polymer electrolyte must be able to penetrate the anode's finest pores to form a complete, homogeneous layer, because only anode oxide sections covered by the electrolyte contribute to the capacitance. For this the precursors of the polymer has to consist of very small base materials that can penetrate even the smallest pores. The size of this precursors are the limiting factor in the size of the pores in the etched aluminium anode foils or of the size of tantalum powder. The rate of polymerization must be controlled for capacitor manufacturing. Too rapid polymerization does not lead to a complete anode coverage, while too slow polymerization increases production costs. Neither the precursors nor the polymer or its residues may attack the anodes oxide chemically or mechanically. The polymer electrolyte must have high stability over a wide temperature range over long times. The polymer film is not only the counter electrode of the e-cap it also protects the dielectric even against external influences such as the direct contact of graphite in this capacitors, which are provided with a cathode contact via graphite and silver.

Polymer e-caps employ either polypyrrole (PPy) or polythiophene (PEDOT or PEDT)

==== Polypyrrole PPy ====
Structural formula of polypyrrole, doped with p-Toluenesulfonic acid

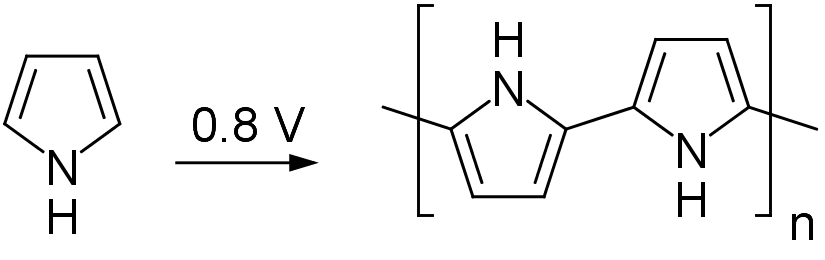
Pyrrole can be polymerized electrochemically to control the rate of polymerizion.

Polypyrrole (PPy) is a conducting polymer formed by oxidative polymerization of pyrrole. A suitable oxidizing agent is iron (III) chloride (FeCl_{3}). Water, methanol, ethanol, acetonitrile and other polar solvents may be used for the synthesis of PPy. As a solid conducting polymer electrolyte It reaches conductivities up to 100 S/m. Polypyrrole was the first conductive polymer used in polymer Al-e-caps as well as in polymer Ta-e-caps.

The problem with the polymerization of PPy was the rate of polymerization. When pyrrole is mixed with the desired oxidizing agents at room temperature, the polymerization reaction begins immediately. Thus polypyrrole begins to form, before the chemical solution can get into the anode pores. The polymerization rate can be controlled by cryogenic cooling or by electrochemical polymerization.

The cooling method requires a very great technical effort and is unfavorable for mass production. In the electrochemical polymerization at first an auxiliary electrode layer on the dielectric has to be applied and to be connected to the anode. For this purpose, ionic dopants are added to the basic substances of the polymer, forming a conductive surface layer on the dielectric during the first impregnation. During subsequent impregnation cycles, the in-situ polymerization can be time-controlled by the current flow after applying a voltage between the anode and cathode. With this method a fine and stable polypyrrole film on the dielectric oxide layer of the anode can be realized. However, both methods of in situ polymerization are complex and require multiple repetition polymerization steps that increase manufacturing costs.

The polypyrrole electrolyte has two fundamental disadvantages. It is toxic in the production of capacitors and becomes unstable at the higher soldering temperatures required for soldering with lead-free solders.

==== Polythiopene PEDOT and PEDOT:PSS ====
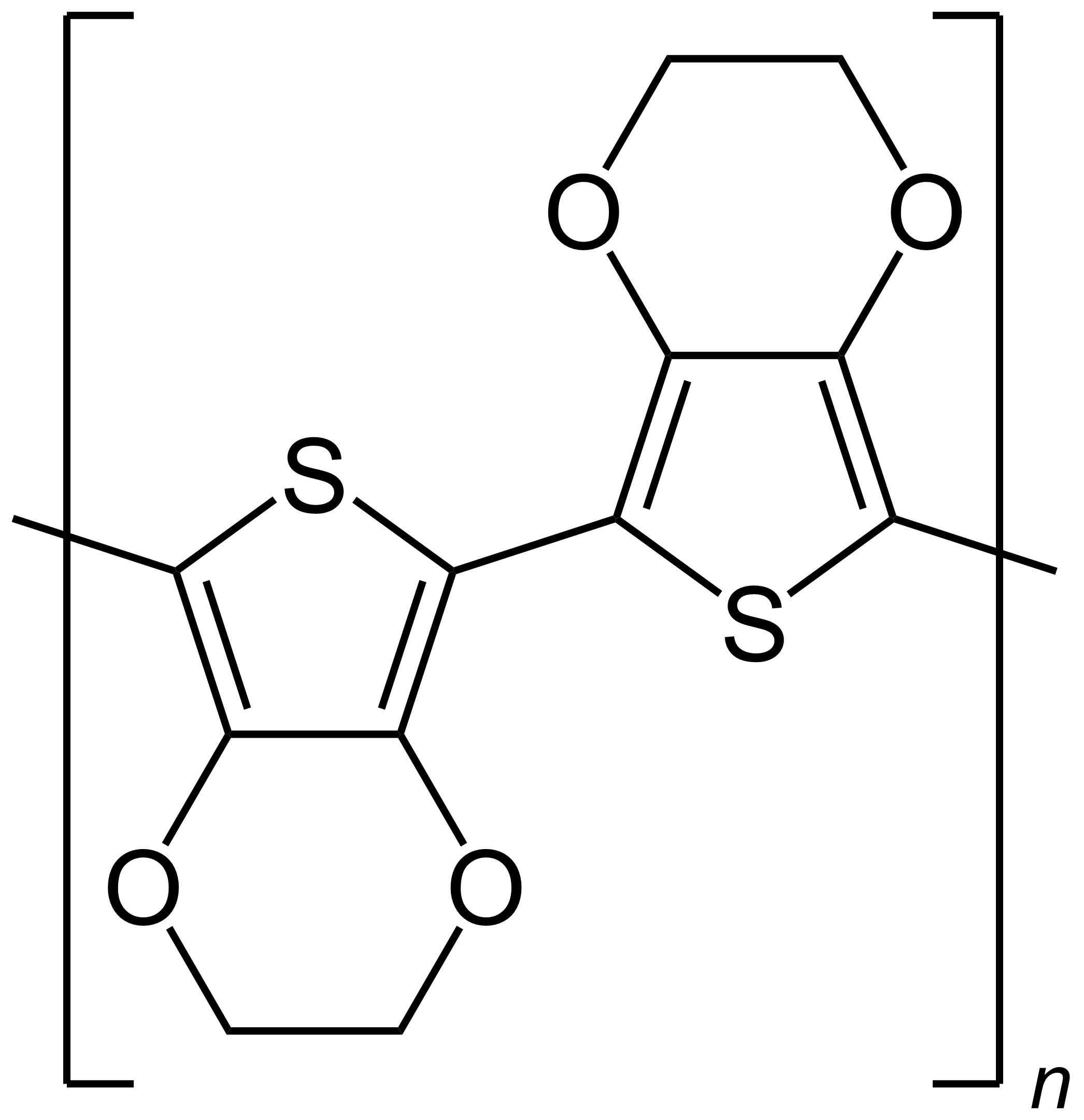
Structural formula of PEDOT

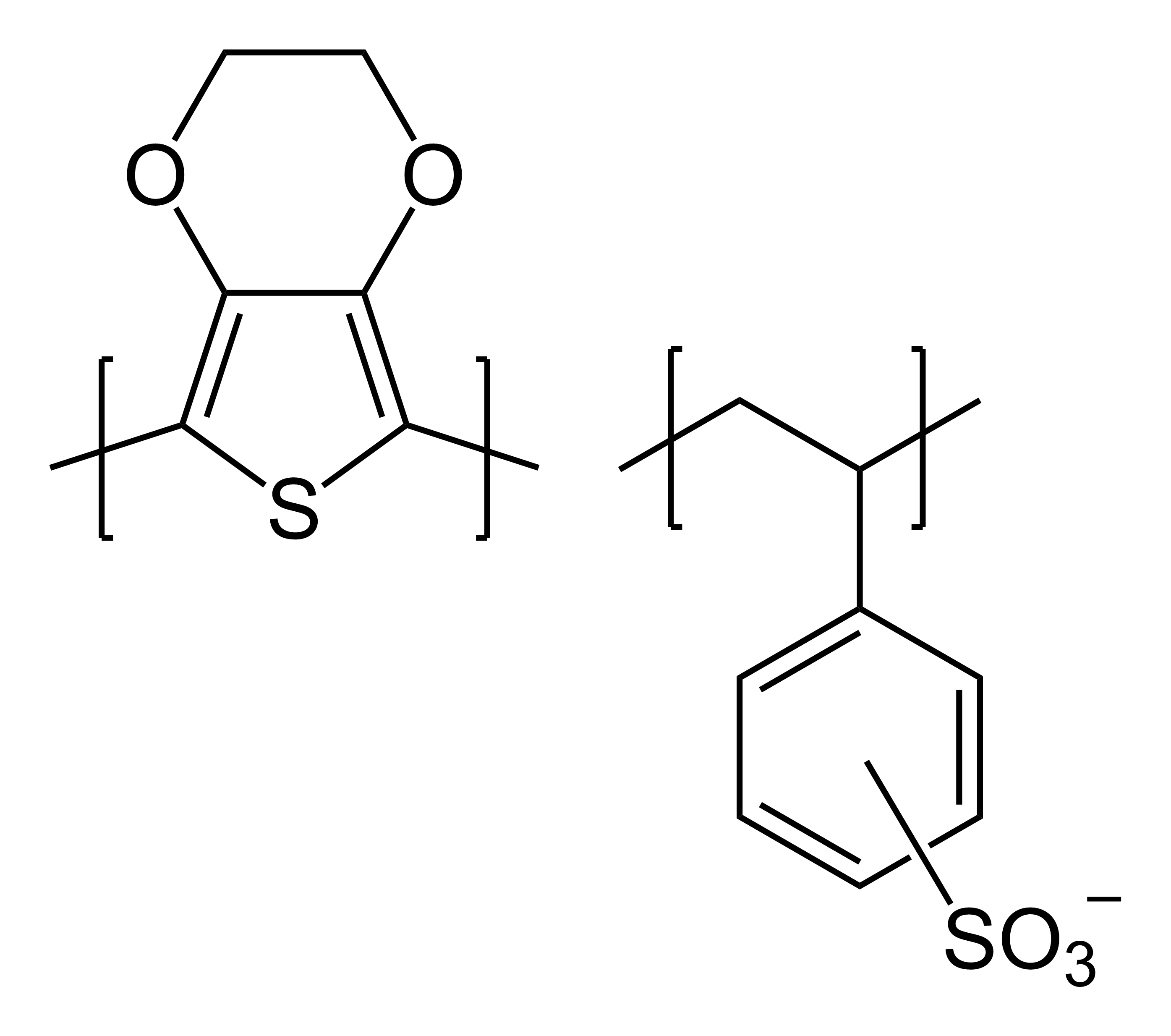
Structural formula of PEDOT:PSS

Poly(3,4-ethylenedioxythiophene), abbreviated PEDOT or PEDT is a conducting polymer based on 3,4-ethylenedioxythiophene or EDOT monomer. PEDOT is polarized by the oxidation of EDOT with catalytic amounts of iron(III) sulfate. The re-oxidation of iron is given by Sodium persulfate. Advantages of PEDOT are optical transparency in its conducting state, non toxic, stable up to temperatures of 280 °C and a conductivity up to 500 S/m. Its heat resistance allows polymer capacitors to be manufactured that withstand the higher temperatures required for lead-free soldering. Additional this capacitors have better ESR values as polymer e-caps with PPy electrolyte.

The difficult methods of in situ polymerization of PEDOT in the anodes of the capacitors initially were at first the same as with polypyrrole. This changed with the development of pre-polymerized dispersions of PEDOT in which the capacitor anodes simple could be dipped and then dried at room temperature. For this purpose, the PEDOT chemicals is added with sodium polystyrene sulfonate (PSS) and dissolved in water. The complete polymer layer on the dielectric is then composed of pre-polymerized particles from the dispersion. These dispersions are known as PEDOT: PSS, trade names Baytron P® and Clevios™, protecting PEDOT's valuable properties.

PEDOT:PSS dispersions are available in different variants. For capacitors with high capacitance values with high-roughened aluminium anode foils or fine-grained tantalum powders, dispersions having very small particle sizes are offered. The average size of these pre-polymerized particles is about 30 nm, small enough to penetrate the finest anode capillaries. Another variant of a PEDOT:PSS dispersion has been developed with larger pre-polymerized particles leading to a relatively thick polymer layer in order to make an enveloping protection of the capacitive cell of rectangular Ta and Al polymer capacitors against mechanical and electrical stress.

With PEDOT:PSS dispersions produced polymer aluminium electrolytic capacitors are well suited to reach higher rated voltage values of 200 V and 250 V. In addition, the leakage current values of the polymer electrolytic capacitors, which are produced with these dispersions, are significantly lower than for polymer capacitors having in-situ polymerized polymer layers.. Beneath to the better ESR values, higher temperature stability and lower leakage current values, however, the ease of manufacture of polymer capacitors with the pre-polymerized PEDOT:PSS dispersions, which in already only three dips of immersion have an almost complete coverage of the dielectric with a conducting polymer layer. This approach significantly has reduced production costs.

==== Hybrid electrolyte ====
Hybrid polymer aluminium electrolytic capacitors combine a coating of the roughened and oxidized aluminium anode structure with a conductive polymer together with a liquid electrolyte. The liquid electrolyte is soaked in the separator (spacer) and achieves with its ion conductivity the electrical contact between the two polymer layers covering the dielectric and on the cathode foil. The liquid electrolyte can supply the oxygen for self-healing processes of the capacitor, which reduces the leakage current, so that values such as in conventional "wet" the electrolytic capacitor can be achieved. In addition the safety margin for the required oxide thickness for a desired rated voltage can be reduced.

The detrimental effects of the liquid electrolyte on ESR and temperature characteristics are relatively low. By using appropriate organic electrolytes and a good sealing of the capacitors a long service life can be achieved.

== Types and styles ==
Based on the used anode metal and the combination of a polymer electrolyte together with a liquid electrolyte, there are three different types:

- Polymer tantalum electrolytic capacitor
- Polymer aluminium electrolytic capacitor
- Hybrid polymer aluminium electrolytic capacitor

These three different types or families, are produced in two different styles,

- Rectangular SMD chip, usually molded with a plastic case, available with sintered tantalum anode or with stacked aluminium anode foils and
- Cylindrical style with a wound cell in a metal case, available as cylindrical SMDs (V-chips) style or as radial leaded versions (single-ended)
Styles of polymer electrolytic capacitors

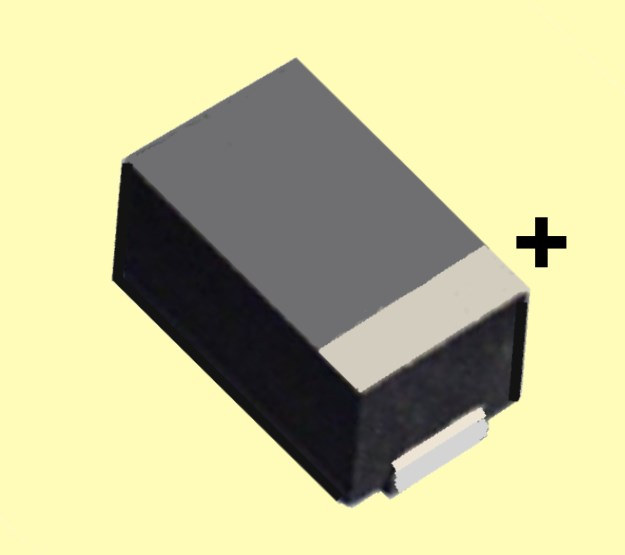
Rectangular SMD chips are available with sintered tantalum anode or with stacked aluminum anode foils

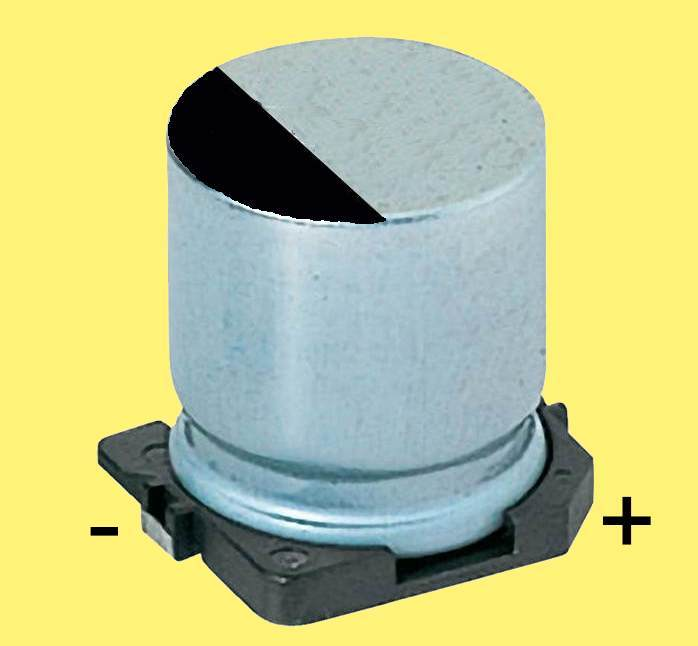
Cylindrical styles with a wound cell in a metal case are available as SMDs (V-chips) or as radial leaded versions (single-ended) for polymer or hybrid polymer aluminum capacitors

=== Rectangular chip style ===
In the early 1990s polymer Ta-caps coincided with the emergence of flat devices such as mobile phones and laptops using SMD assembly technology. The rectangular base surface achieves the maximum mounting space, which is not possible with round base surfaces. The sintered cell can be manufactured so that the finished component has a desired height, typically the height of other components. Typical heights range from about 0.8 to 4 mm.

==== Polymer tantalum chip capacitors ====
Polymer tantalum electrolytic capacitors are essentially tantalum capacitors in which the electrolyte is a conductive polymer instead of manganese dioxide, see also tantalum capacitor#Materials, production and styles Tantalum capacitors are manufactured from a powder of relatively pure elemental tantalum metal.

The powder is compressed around a tantalum wire, the anode connection, to form a "pellet". This pellet/wire combination is subsequently vacuum sintered at high temperature (typically 1200 to 1800 °C) which produces a mechanically strong anode pellet. During sintering, the powder takes on a sponge-like structure, with all the particles interconnected into a monolithic spatial lattice. This structure is of predictable mechanical strength and density, but is also highly porous, producing a large anode surface area.

The dielectric layer is then formed over all the tantalum particle surfaces of the anode by the electrochemical process of anodization or forming. To achieve this, the "pellet" is submerged into a very weak solution of acid and DC voltage is applied. The total dielectric thickness is determined by the final voltage applied during the forming process. Thereafter, the oxidized sintered block is impregnated with the precursors of the polymer, to achieve the polymer electrolyte, the counter electrode. This polymerized pellet now is successively dipped into conducting graphite and then silver to provide a good connection to the conducting polymer. This layers achieves the cathode connection of the capacitor. The capacitive cell then is generally molded by a synthetic resin.

Basic construction of a polymer tantalum capacitor

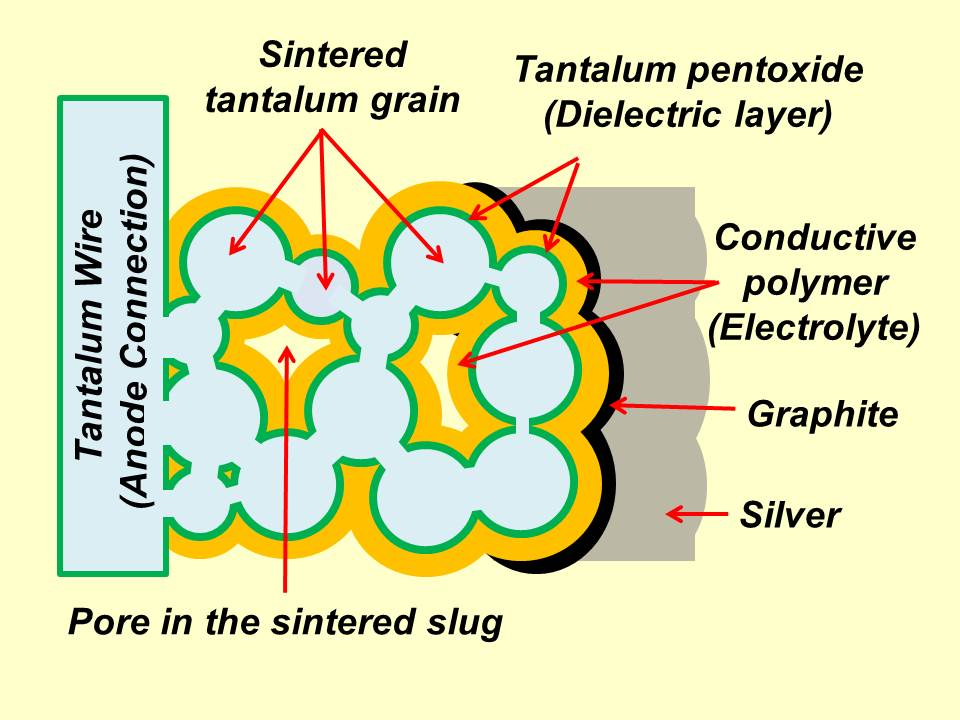
Layer structure of a polymer tantalum capacitor with graphit/silver cathode connection

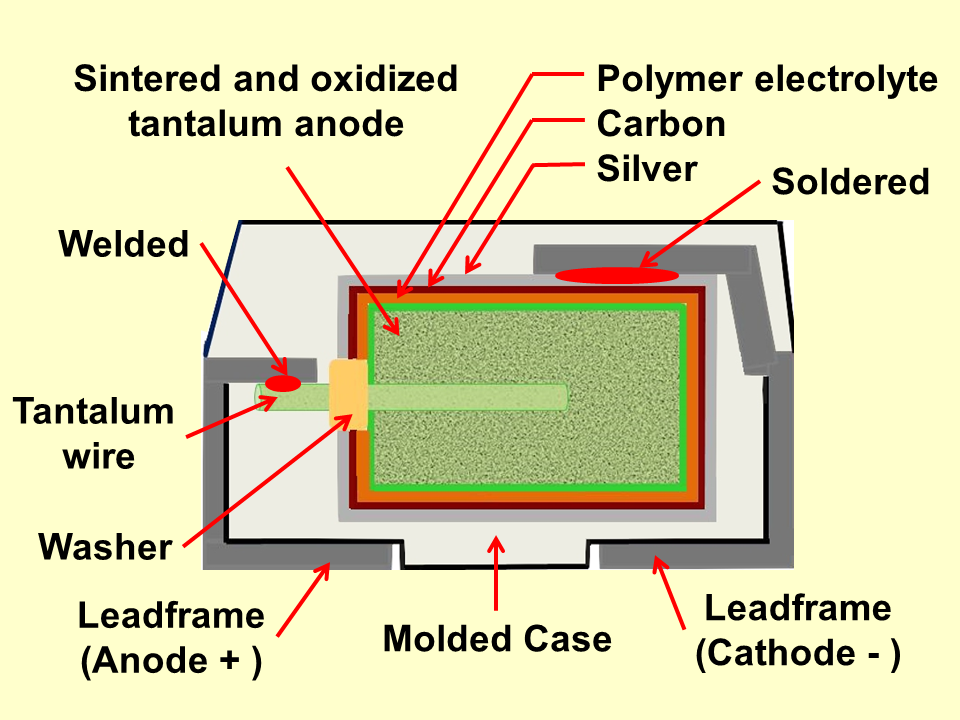
Basic cross-section of a rectangular polymer tantalum chip capacitor

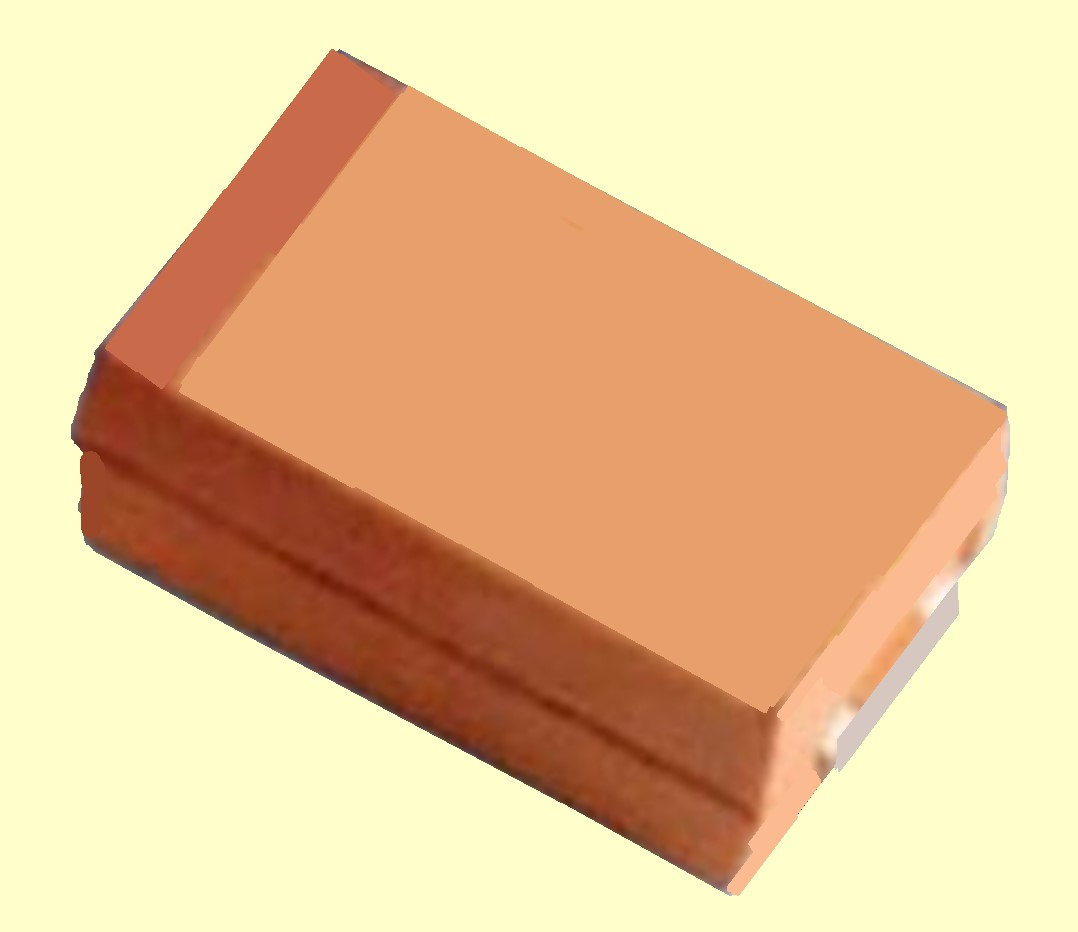
Rectangular polymer tantalum chip capacitor

Polymer tantalum electrolytic capacitors have ESR values that are approximately only 1/10 of the value of tantalum electrolytic capacitors with manganese dioxide electrolyte of the same size. By a multi-anode technique in which several anode blocks are connected in parallel in one case, the ESR value can be reduced again. The advantage of the multi-anode technology in addition to the very low ESR values is the lower inductance ESL, whereby the capacitors are suitable for higher frequencies.

The disadvantage of all polymer tantalum capacitors is the higher leakage current, which is approximately by a factor of 10 higher compared to the capacitors with manganese dioxide electrolyte. Polymer SMD Tantalum Electrolytic Capacitors are available up to a size of 7.3x4.3x4.3 mm (length × width × height) with a capacity of 1000 μF at 2.5 V. They cover temperature ranges from −55 °C to +125 °C and are available in rated voltage values from 2.5 to 63 V.

==== New designs – lowering ESR and ESL ====
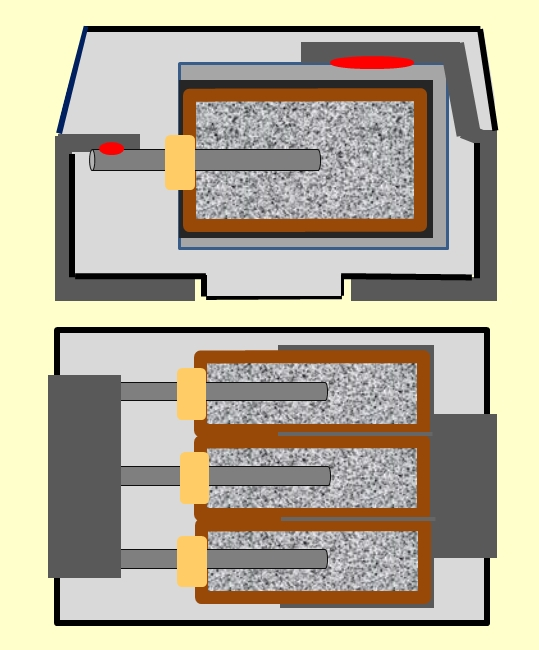
The multi-anode construction has several sintered tantalum anodes which are connected in parallel, whereby both ESR and ESL will be reduced.

Lowering ESR and ESL remains a major research and development objective for all polymer capacitors. Some constructive measures can have also a major impact on the electrical parameters of capacitors. Smaller ESR values can be achieved for example by parallel connection of several conventional capacitor cells in one case. Three parallel capacitors with an ESR of 60 mΩ each have a resulting ESR of 20 mΩ. This technology is called "multi-anode" construction and is used in very low ESR polymer tantalum capacitors. In this construction up to six individual anodes in one case are connected. This design is offered as polymer tantalum chip capacitors as well as lower expensive tantalum chip capacitors with MnO_{2} electrolyte. Multi-anode polymer tantalum capacitors have ESR values on the single-digit milliohm range.

Another simple constructive measure changes the parasitic inductance of the capacitor, the ESL. Since the length of the leads inside the capacitor case has a large amount of the total ESL the inductance of the capacitor can be reduced by reducing the length of the internal leads by asymmetric sintering of the anode lead. This technique is called "face-down" construction. Due to the lower ESL of this face-down construction the resonance of the capacitor is shifted to higher frequencies, which take into account the faster load changes of digital circuits with ever-higher switching frequencies.

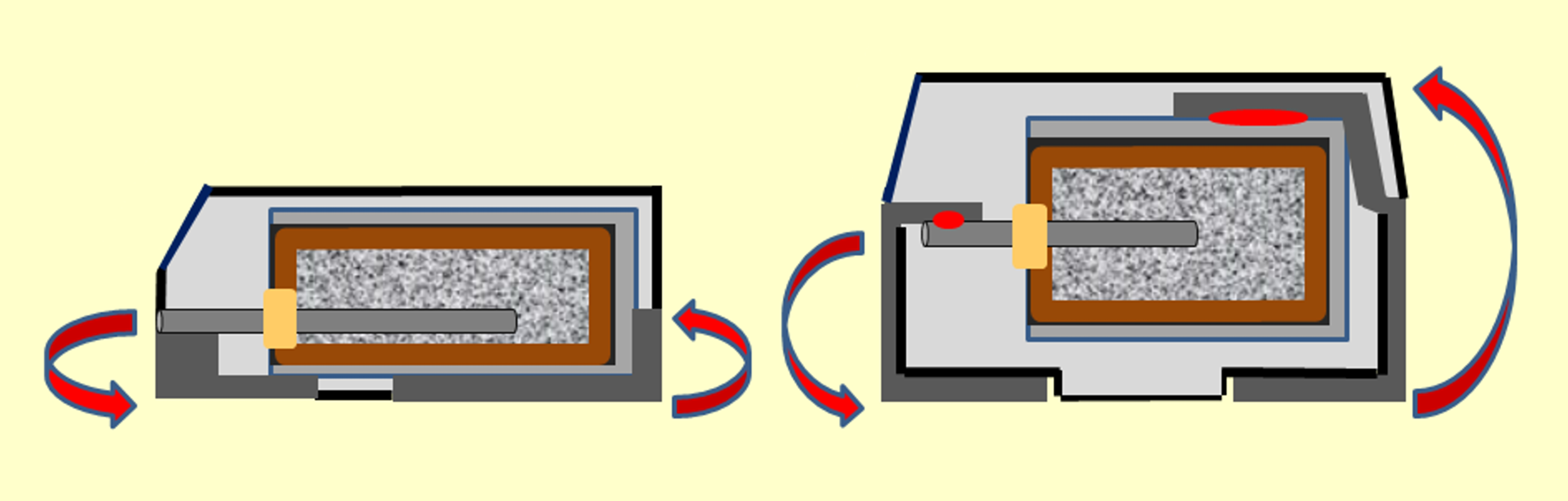
In the "face-down" construction of tantalum chip capacitors, the internal current path is constructively reduced, which reduce the parasitic impedance (ESL) with the result, that the resonance shifts to higher frequencies. Simply said, the capacitor gets "faster"

Polymer tantalum chip capacitors with these new design enhancements, that both the ESR and the ESL decreased reaching properties, approaching ever closer to those of MLCC capacitors.

==== Polymer aluminium chip capacitors ====
Rectangular polymer Al-caps have one or more layered aluminium anode foils and a conductive polymer electrolyte. The layered anode foils are at one side contacted with each other, this block is anodically oxidized to achieve the dielectric, and the block is impregnated with the precursors of the polymer to achieve the polymer electrolyte, the counter electrode. Like for polymer tantalum capacitors this polymerized block now is successively dipped into conducting graphite and then silver to provide a good connection to the conducting polymer. This layers achieves the cathode connection of the capacitor. The capacitive cell then generally is molded by a synthetic resin.

Basic construction of a polymer aluminum capacitor with layered anode stripes

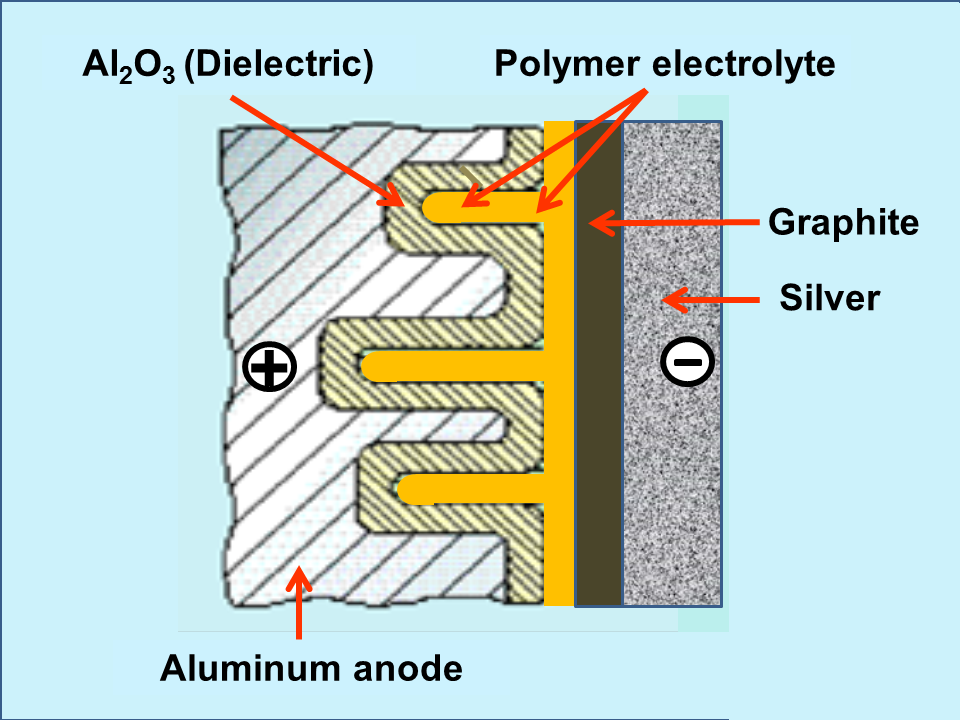
Layer structure of a polymer aluminum capacitor with graphit/silver cathode connection

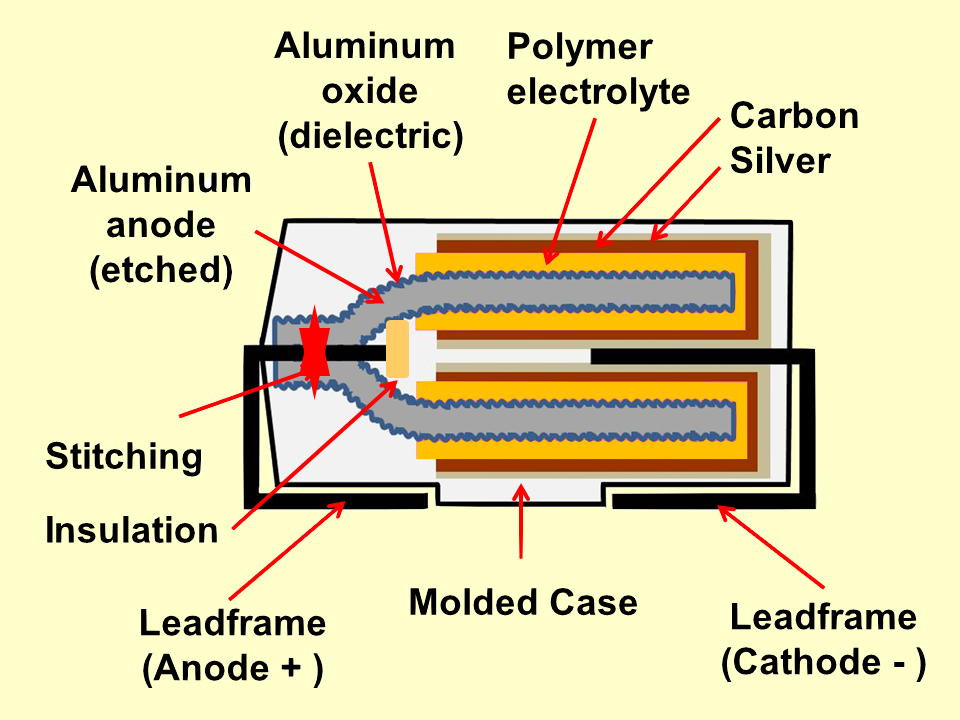
Basic cross-section of a rectangular polymer aluminum chip capacitor

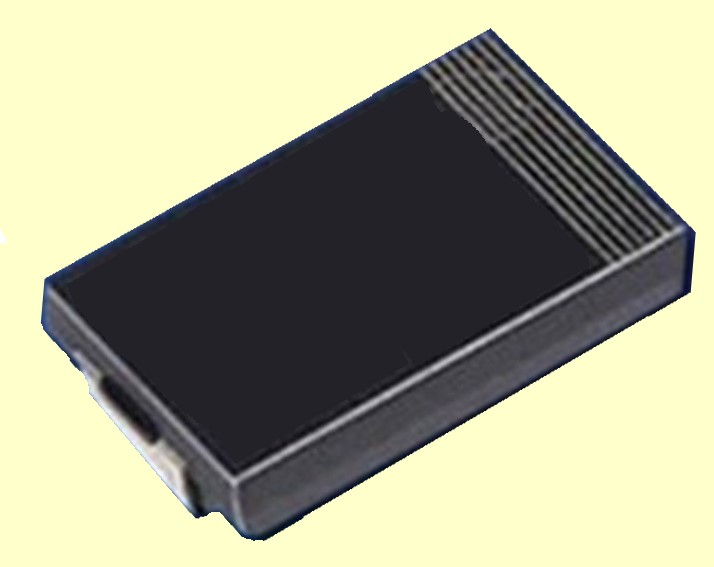
Rectangular polymer aluminum chip capacitor. The external appearance has no indication of the used internally anode material.

The layered anode foils in the rectangular shaped polymer Al-chip-e-caps are electrically parallel connected single capacitors. Thus, the ESR and ESL values are connected in parallel reducing ESR and ESL correspondingly, and allowing them to operate at higher frequencies.

These rectangular polymer Al-chip-e-caps are available in the "D"-case with dimensions of 7.3x4.3 mm and heights of between 2 and 4 mm. They provide a competitive alternative to Ta-caps.

Comparing mechanical comparable polymer Al-chip-e-caps and polymer Ta-chip-e-caps shows that the different permittivities of aluminium oxide and tantalum pentoxide have little impact on the specific capacity due to different safety margins in oxide layers. Polymer Ta-e-caps use an oxide layer thickness that corresponds to approximately four times the rated voltage, while the polymer Al-e-caps have about twice the rated voltage.

=== Cylindrical (radial) style ===
Cylindrical polymer aluminium capacitors based on the technique of wound aluminium electrolytic capacitors with liquid electrolytes. They are available only with aluminium as anode material.

They are intended for larger capacitance values compared to rectangular polymer capacitors. Due to their design, they may vary in height on a given surface mounting area so that larger capacitance values can be achieved by a taller case without increasing the mounting surface. This is primarily useful for printed circuit boards without a height limit.

==== Cylindrical polymer aluminium capacitors ====
Cylindrical polymer Al-e-caps are made of two aluminum foils, an etched and formed anode and a cathode foil that are mechanically separated by a separator and wound together. The winding is impregnated with the polymer precursors to achieve the polymerized conducting polymer to form cathode the polymer electrode, electrically connected to the cathode foil. The winding then is built into an aluminum case and sealed with a rubber sealing. For the SMD version (Vertical chip= V-chip) the case is provided with a bottom plate.

Design principles of cylindrical polymer aluminum capacitors

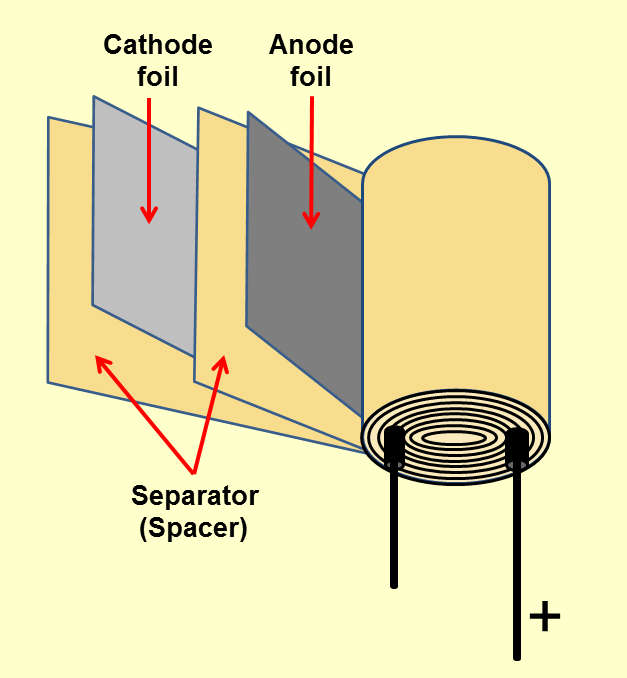
Winding of an aluminum electrolytic capacitor

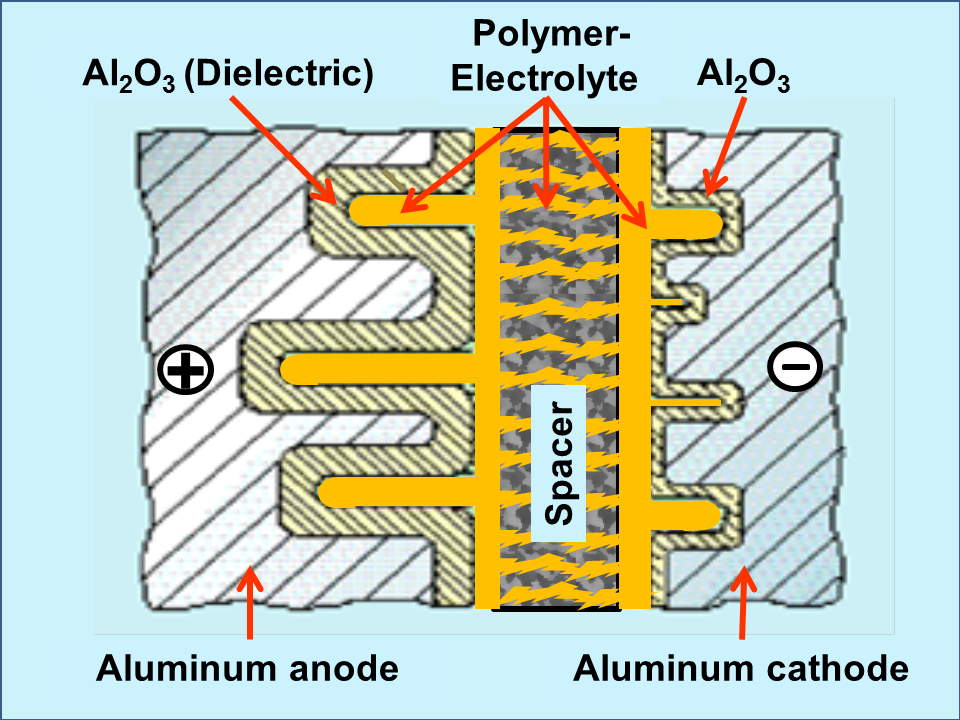
Cross-sectional view of the capacitive cell of a wound polymer aluminum capacitor with polymer electrolyte

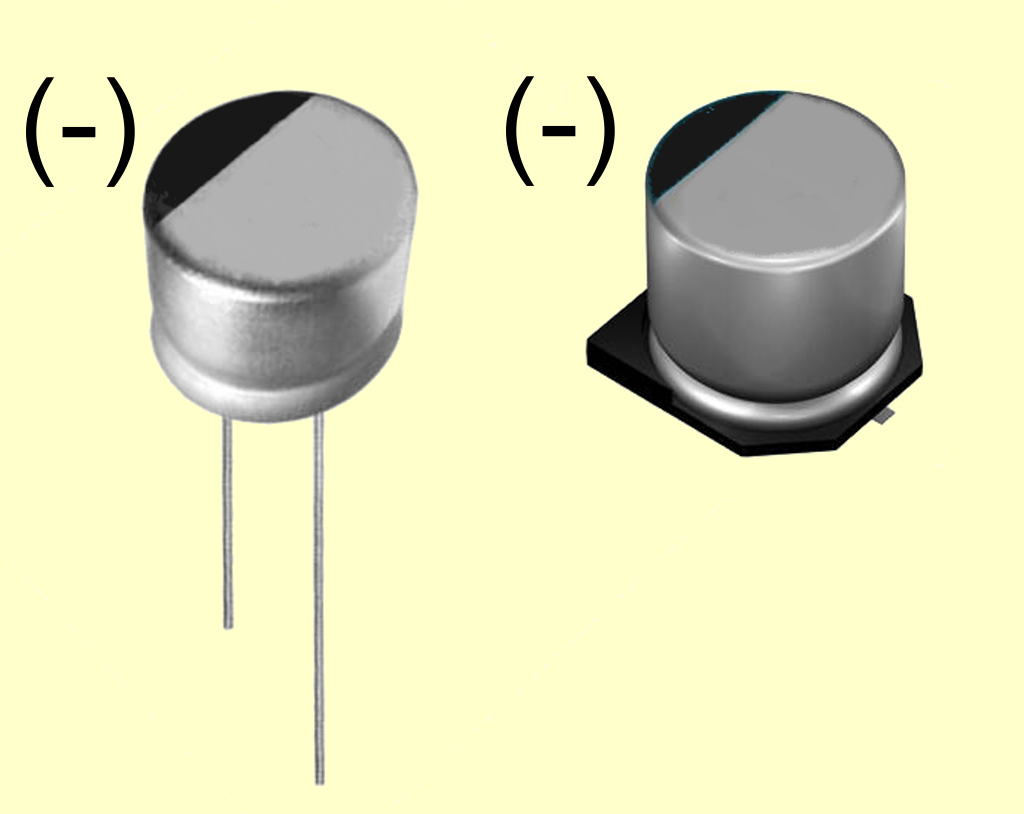
Cylindrical polymer aluminum capacitors with wound cell in cylindrical metal case, in radial leaded (single-ended) and SMD style (V-chip)

The cylindrical polymer Al-e-caps are less expensive than corresponding polymer tantalum capacitors for a given CV value (capacitance × rated voltage). They are available up to a size of 10×13 mm (diameter × height) with a CV value of 3900 μF×2.5 V They can cover temperature ranges from -55 °C to +125 °C and are available in nominal voltage values from 2.5 to 200 V respectively 250 V.

Unlike "wet" Al-e-caps, the cases of polymer Al capacitors do not have a vent (notch) in the bottom of the case, since a short circuit does not form gas, which would increase pressure in the case. Therefore, a predetermined breaking point is not required.

==== Hybrid polymer aluminum capacitors ====
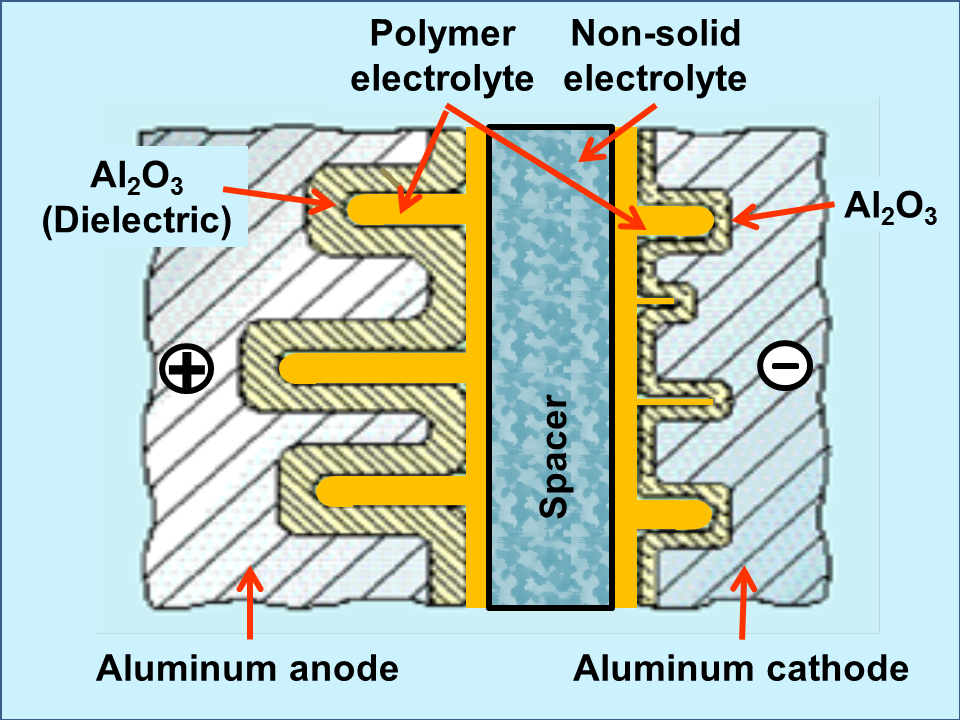
Cross-sectional view of the capacitive cell of a hybrid polymer aluminum capacitor, polymer electrolyte in the pores of the aluminum foils and liquid electrolyte as the electrical connection between the polymer layers.

Hybrid polymer capacitors are available only in the cylindrical style construction thus corresponds to the above-described cylindrical polymer Al-e-caps leaded in the radial (single-ended) design or with a base plate in the SMD version (V-chip). The difference is that the polymer only covers the surface of the roughened structure of the dielectric Al_{2}O_{3} and the surface of the cathode foil as thin layers. With this especially the high-ohmic parts in the small pores of the anode foil can be made low-ohmic to reduce the capacitors ESR. As electrical connection between both polymer layers serve a liquid electrolyte like in conventional wet Al-e-caps impregnating the separator. The small distance the non-solid electrolyte conduct increases the ESR a little bit, however in fact not dramatically. Advantage of this construction is that the liquid electrolyte in operation delivers the oxygen which is necessary for self-healing of the dielectric layer in the presence of any small defects.

The current that flows through a small defect results in selective heating, which normally destroys the overlying polymer film, isolating, but not healing, the defect. In hybrid polymer capacitors liquid can flow to the defect, delivering oxygen and healing the dielectric by generating new oxides, decreasing the leakage current. Hybrid polymer Al-e-caps have a much lower leakage current than standard polymer Al-e-caps.

== Comparison of the polymer families ==
=== Comparison of benchmarks ===
The polymer electrolyte, the two different anode materials, aluminum and tantalum, together with the different designs led to multiple polymer e-cap families with different specifications. For comparison, the basic parameters of the tantalum electrolytic capacitors with manganese dioxide electrolyte are also listed.

Comparison of benchmark values of the different polymer capacitor families
Anode material	Electrolyte	Style	Capacitance range (μF)	Rated voltage (V)	Max. operation temperature (°C)
Tantalum	Manganese dioxide	rectangular	0.1...1,500	2.5...63	105/125/150/175
Tantalum	Polymer	rectangular	0.47...3,300	2.5...125	105/125
Aluminum	Polymer	rectangular	2.2...560	2.0...16	105/125
Aluminum	Polymer	cylindrical (SMD and radial)	3.3...3,900	2.0...200	105/125/135
Aluminum	Hybrid, polymer and non-solid	cylindrical (SMD and radial)	6.8...1,000	6.3...125	105/125

(As of April 2015)

=== Comparison of electrical parameters ===
Electrical properties of polymer capacitors can best be compared, using consistent capacitance, rated voltage and dimensions. The values for the ESR and the ripple current are the most important parameters for the use of for polymer capacitors in electronic equipment. The leakage current is significant, because it is higher than that of e-caps with non-polymer electrolytes. The respective values of Ta-e-caps with MnO_{2} electrolyte and wet Al-e-caps are included.

Comparison of the main electrical parameters of different e-cap families for types with the same size
E-cap family electrolyte	Type^{1}	Dimensions^{2} W×L×H D×L (mm)	Max. ESR 100 kHz, 20 °C (mΩ)	Max. ripple current 85/105 °C (mA)	Max. leakage current^{3} after 2 min (μA)
MnO_{2}-tantalum capacitors MnO_{2}-electrolyte	Kemet, T494; 330/10	7.3×4.3×4.0	100	1,285	10 (0.01CV)
MnO_{2}-tantalum capacitors Multianode, MnO_{2}-Electrolyte	Kemet, T510; 330/10	7.3×4.3×4.0	35	2,500	10 (0.01CV)
Polymer tantalum capacitors polymer electrolyte	Kemet, T543; 330/10	7.3×4.3×4.0	10	4,900	100 (0.1CV)
Polymer tantalum capacitors multianode, polymer electrolyte	Kemet, T530; 150/10	7.3×4.3×4.0	5	4,970	100 (0.1CV)
Polymer aluminum capacitors polymer electrolyte	Panasonic, SP-UE; 180/6.3	7.3×4.3×4.2	7	3,700	40 (0.04CV)
Polymer aluminum capacitors polymer electrolyte	Kemet, A700; 220/6.3	7.3×4.3×4.3	10	4,700	40 (0.04CV)
"Wet" aluminum capacitors, SMD ethylene glycol/forax-electrolyte	NIC, NACY, 220/10	6.3x8	300	300	10 (0.01CV)
"Wet" aluminum capacitors, SMD water-based electrolyte	NIC, NAZJ, 220/16	6.3×8	160	600	10 (0.01CV)
Polymer aluminum capacitors polymer electrolyte	Panasonic, SVP; 120/6.3	6,3×6	17	2,780	200 (0.2CV)
Hybrid polymer aluminum capacitors polymer + non-solid electrolyte	Panasonic, ZA; 100/25	6.3×7.7	30	2,000	10 (0.01CV)

^{1} Manufacturer, series, capacitance/rated voltage.
^{2} W×L×H for rectangular style (chip), D×L for cylindrical style.
^{3} Calculated for a 100 μF, 10 V capacitor.

(As of June 2015)

=== Advantages and disadvantages ===
Advantages of polymer e-caps against wet Al-e-caps:

- lower ESR values.
- higher ripple current capability
- lower temperature depending characteristics
- no evaporation of electrolyte, longer service life
- no burning or exploding in case of shorts

Disadvantages of polymer e-caps against wet Al-e-caps:

- more expensive
- higher leakage current
- damageable by transients and higher voltages spikes

Advantages of hybrid polymer Al-e-caps:

- less expensive than polymer aluminum e-caps
- lower leakage current
- impassible against transients

Disadvantage of hybrid polymer Al-e-caps:

- limited service life due to evaporation

Advantages of polymer Ta and Al-e-caps against MLCCs (ceramic):

- no voltage dependent capacitance (except type 1 ceramics)
- no microphonic (except type 1 ceramics)
- higher capacitance values possible

== Electrical characteristics ==
=== Series-equivalent circuit ===
Series-equivalent circuit model of an electrolytic capacitor

The electrical characteristics of capacitors are harmonized by the international generic specification IEC 60384-1. In this standard, the electrical characteristics of capacitors are described by an idealized series-equivalent circuit with electrical components which model all ohmic losses, capacitive and inductive parameters of electrolytic capacitors:

- C, the capacitance of the capacitor
- R_{ESR}, the equivalent series resistance which summarizes all ohmic losses of the capacitor, usually abbreviated as "ESR"
- L_{ESL}, the equivalent series inductance which is the effective self-inductance of the capacitor, usually abbreviated as "ESL".
- R_{leak}, the resistance representing the leakage current of the capacitor

=== Rated capacitance, standard values and tolerances ===
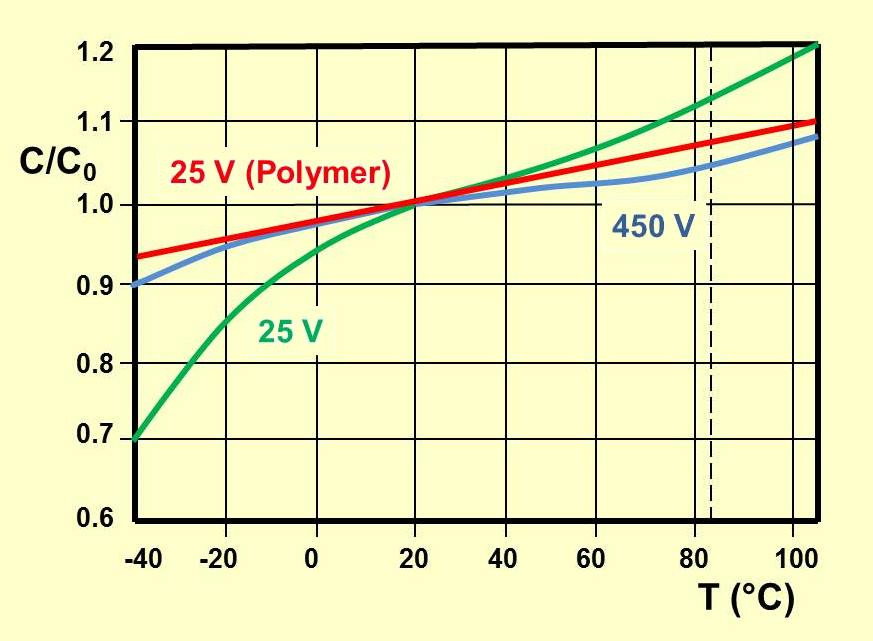
Typical capacitance capacitor as a function of temperature for a polymer Al-e-cap and two non-solid Al-e-caps

The capacitance value of polymer electrolytic capacitors depends on measuring frequency and temperature. Electrolytic capacitors with non-solid electrolytes show a broader aberration over frequency and temperature ranges than polymer capacitors.

The standardized measuring condition for polymer Al-e-caps is an AC measuring method with 0.5 V at a frequency of 100/120 Hz and a temperature of 20 °C. For polymer Ta-e-caps a DC bias voltage of 1.1 to 1.5 V for types with a rated voltage ≤2.5 V, or 2.1 to 2.5 V for types with a rated voltage of >2.5 V, may be applied during the measurement to avoid reverse voltage.

The capacitance value measured at the frequency of 1 kHz is about 10% less than the 100/120 Hz value. Therefore, the capacitance values of polymer e-caps are not directly comparable and differ from those of film capacitors or ceramic capacitors, whose capacitance is measured at 1 kHz or higher.

The basic unit of a polymer electrolytic capacitor's capacitance is the microfarad (μF). The capacitance value specified in manufacturers data sheets is called the rated capacitance C_{R} or nominal capacitance C_{N}. It is given according to IEC 60063 in values corresponding to the E series. These values are specified with a capacitance tolerance in accordance with IEC 60062 preventing overlaps.

E3 series	E6 series	E12 series
10-22-47	10-15-22-33-47-68	10-12-15-18-22-27; 33-39-47-56-68-82
capacitance tolerance ±20%	capacitance tolerance ±20%	capacitance tolerance ±10%
letter code "M"	letter code "M"	letter code "K"

The actual measured capacitance value must be within the tolerance limits.

=== Rated and category voltage ===
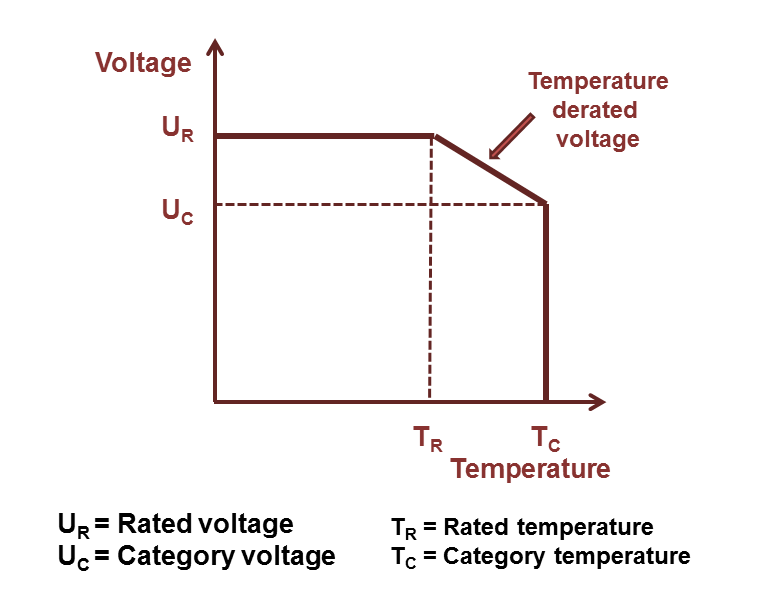
Relation between rated voltage U_{R} and category voltage U_{C} and rated temperature T_{R} and category temperature T_{C}

Referring to IEC 60384-1, the allowed operating voltage for polymer e-caps is called the "rated voltage U_{R}". The rated voltage U_{R} is the maximum DC voltage or peak pulse voltage that may be applied continuously at any temperature within the rated temperature range T_{R}.

The voltage proof of electrolytic capacitors decreases with increasing temperature. For some applications it is important to use a higher temperature range. Lowering the voltage applied at a higher temperature maintains safety margins. For some capacitor types therefore the IEC standard specifies a "temperature derated voltage" for a higher temperature, the "category voltage U_{C}". The category voltage is the maximum DC voltage or peak pulse voltage that may be applied continuously to a capacitor at any temperature within the category temperature range T_{C}. The relation between both voltages and temperatures is given in the picture at right.

Applying a higher voltage than specified may destroy electrolytic capacitors.

Applying a lower voltage may have a positive influence on polymer electrolytic capacitors. For hybrid polymer Al-e-caps a lower applied voltage in some cases can extend the lifetime. For polymer Ta-e-caps lowering the voltage applied increases the reliability and reduces the expected failure rate.

=== Rated and category temperature ===
The relation between rated temperature T_{R} and rated voltage U_{R} as well as higher category temperature T_{C} and derated category voltage U_{C} is given in the picture at right.

=== Surge Voltage ===
Polymer e-cap oxide layers are formed for safety reasons at a higher voltage than the rated voltage, called a surge voltage. Therefore, it is allowed to apply a surge voltage for short times and a limited number of cycles.

The surge voltage indicates the maximum peak voltage value that may be applied during their application for a limited number of cycles. The surge voltage is standardized in IEC 60384-1.

For polymer Al-e-caps the surge voltage is 1.15 times the rated voltage. For polymer Ta-e-caps the surge voltage can be 1.3 times the rated voltage, rounded off to the nearest volt.

The surge voltage applied to polymer capacitors may influence the capacitor's failure rate.

=== Transient Voltage ===
Transients are fast and high voltage spikes. Polymer electrolytic capacitors, aluminum as well as tantalum polymer capacitors can not withstand transients or peak voltages higher than surge voltage. Transients for this type of e-caps may destroy the components.

Hybrid polymer Al-e-caps are relatively insensitive to high and short- term transient voltages higher than surge voltage, if the frequency and the energy content of the transients are low. This ability depends on rated voltage and component size. Low energy transient voltages lead to a voltage limitation similar to a zener diode An unambiguous and general specification of tolerable transients or peak voltages is not possible. In every case transients arise, the application must be individually assessed.

=== Reverse voltage ===
Polymer electrolytic capacitors, tantalum as well as aluminum polymer capacitors are polarized capacitors and generally requires the anode electrode voltage to be positive relative to the cathode voltage. Nevertheless, they can withstand for short instants a type dependent reverse voltage for a limited number of cycles. A reverse voltage higher than the type-dependent threshold level applied for a long time to the polymer electrolyte capacitor leads to short-circuit and to destruction of the capacitor.

To minimize the likelihood of a polarized electrolytic being incorrectly inserted into a circuit, polarity has to be very clearly indicated on the case, see the section on "Polarity marking" below.

=== Impedance and ESR ===
See also: Electrolytic capacitor#Impedance and Electrolytic capacitor#ESR and dissipation factor tan δ

The impedance is the complex ratio of the voltage to the current in an AC circuit, and expresses as AC resistance both magnitude and phase at a particular frequency. In the data sheets of polymer electrolyte capacitors only the impedance magnitude |Z| is specified, and simply written as "Z". Regarding the IEC 60384-1 standard, the impedance values of polymer electrolytic capacitors are measured and specified at 100 kHz.

In the special case of resonance, in which the both reactive resistances X_{C} and X_{L} have the same value (X_{C}=X_{L}), the impedance will be determined by only equivalent series resistance ESR, which summarizes all resistive losses of the capacitor. At 100 kHz the impedance and the ESR have nearly the same value for polymer e-caps with capacitance values in the μF range. With frequencies above the resonance the impedance increases again due to ESL of the capacitor, turning the capacitor into an inductor.

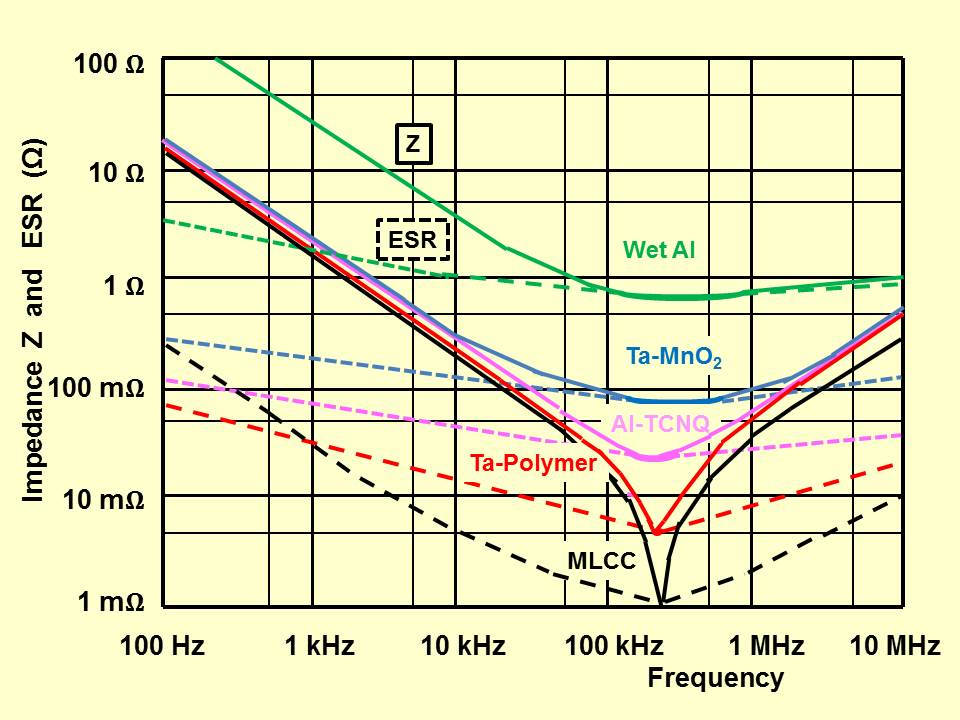
Typical impedance characteristics over the frequency for 100 μF e-caps with different electrolytes compared with a 100 μF class-2 MLCC ceramic capacitor.

Typical curve of the $ESR$ as a function of temperature $T$ for polymer capacitors ( ) and "wet" Al-e-caps ( )

Impedance and ESR, as shown in the curves, heavily depend on the used electrolyte. The curves show the progressively lower impedance and ESR values of "wet" Al-e-caps and MnO_{2} Ta-e-caps, Al/TCNQ and tantalum polymer e-caps. The curve of a ceramic Class 2 MLCC capacitor, with still lower Z and ESR values is also shown, but whose capacitance is voltage-dependent.

An advantage of the polymer e-caps over non-solid Al-e-caps is low temperature dependence and almost linear curve of the ESR over the specified temperature range. This applies both to polymer tantalum, polymer aluminum, as well as for hybrid polymer aluminum e-caps.

Impedance and ESR are also dependent on design and materials of the capacitors. Cylindrical Al-e-caps with the same capacitance as rectangular Al-e-caps have higher inductance than rectangular Al-e-caps with layered electrodes and therefore they have a lower resonant frequency. This effect is amplified by multi-anode construction, in which individual inductances are reduced by their parallel connection and the "face-down" technique.

=== Ripple current ===
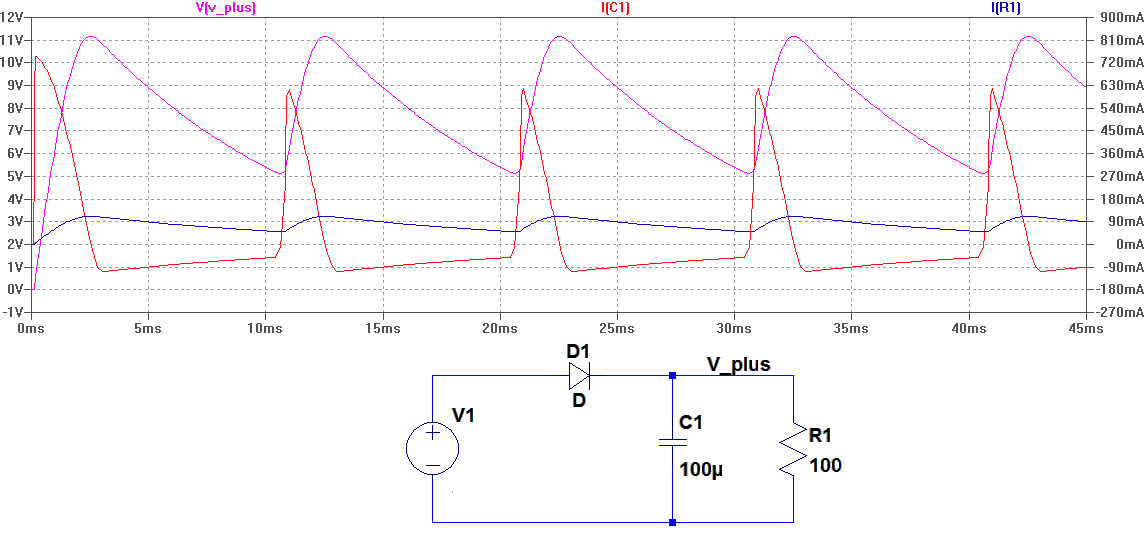
The high ripple current across the smoothing capacitor C1 in a power supply with half-wave rectification causes significant internal heat generation corresponding to the capacitor's ESR.

A "ripple current" is the root mean square (RMS) value of a superimposed AC current of any frequency and any waveform of the current curve for continuous operation within the specified temperature range. It arises mainly in power supplies (including switched-mode power supplies) after rectifying an AC voltage and flows as charge and discharge current through the decoupling or smoothing capacitor.

Ripple currents generates heat inside the capacitor body. This dissipation power loss P_{L} is caused by ESR and is the squared value of the effective (RMS) ripple current I_{R}.

$$P_{L} = I_R^2 \cdot ESR$$

This internally generated heat, additional to the ambient temperature and other external heat sources, leads to a higher capacitor body temperature with a temperature difference of Δ T against the ambient. This heat has to be distributed as thermal losses P_{th} over the capacitor's surface A and the thermal resistance β to the ambient.

$$P_{th} = \Delta T \cdot A \cdot \beta$$

This heat is distributed to the ambient by thermal radiation, convection, and thermal conduction. The temperature of the capacitor, which is the net balance between heat produced and distributed, must not exceed the capacitor's maximum specified temperature.

The ripple current for polymer e-caps is specified as a maximum effective (RMS) value at 100 kHz at upper rated temperature. Non-sinusoidal ripple currents have to be analyzed and separated into their individual single frequencies by means of Fourier analysis and summarized by squared addition to calculate a RMS value.

$$I_R=\sqrt{{i_1}^2 + {i_2}^2  +  {i_3}^2 + {i_n}^2 }$$

Typically, the ripple current value is calculated for a core temperature rise of 2 to 6 °C against ambient, depending on type and manufacturer. The ripple current can be increased at lower temperatures. Because ESR is frequency dependent and rises in low-frequency range, the ripple current must be reduced at lower frequencies.

In polymer Ta-e-caps the heat generated by the ripple current influences the reliability of the capacitors. Exceeding the limit can result in catastrophic failures with short circuits and burning components.

The heat generated by the ripple current also influences the lifetime of aluminum and tantalum electrolytic capacitors with solid polymer electrolytes.

Ripple current heat affects the lifetimes of all three polymer e-cap types.

=== Current surge, peak or pulse current ===
Polymer tantalum electrolytic capacitors are sensitive to peak or pulse currents. Polymer Ta-e-caps which are exposed to surge, peak or pulse currents, for example, in highly inductive circuits, require a voltage derating. If possible the voltage profile should be a ramp turn-on, as this reduces the peak current experienced by the capacitor.

Hybrid polymer Al-e-caps have no restrictions on current surge, peak or pulse currents. However, the summarized currents must not exceed the specified ripple current.

=== Leakage current ===
general leakage behavior of electrolytic capacitors: leakage current $I_{leak}$ as a function of time $t$ for different kinds of electrolytes non solid, high water content non solid, organic solid, polymer

The DC leakage current (DCL) is a unique characteristic for electrolytic capacitors other conventional capacitors do not have. It is the DC current that flows when a DC voltage of correct polarity is applied. This current is represented by the resistor R_{leak} in parallel with the capacitor in the series-equivalent circuit of e-caps. The main causes of DCL for solid polymer capacitors are, for example, points of electrical dielectric breakdown after soldering, unwanted conductive paths due to impurities or due to poor anodization, and for rectangular types bypassing of dielectric due to excess MnO_{2}, due to moisture paths or cathode conductors (carbon, silver).

Datasheet leakage current specification is given by multiplication of the rated capacitance value C_{R} with the value of the rated voltage U_{R} together with an added figure, measured after 2 or 5 minutes, for example a formula for non-solid Al-e-caps:

$$I_\mathrm{Leak} = 0{.}01\,\mathrm{{A}\over{ V \cdot F}} \cdot U_\mathrm R \cdot C_\mathrm R + 3\,\mathrm{\mu A}$$

Leakage current in solid polymer e-caps generally drops very fast but then remain on the reached level. The value depends on the voltage applied, temperature, measuring time and influence of moisture caused by case sealing conditions.

Polymer e-caps have relatively high leakage current values. This leakage current cannot be reduced by "healing" in the sense of generating new oxide, because under normal conditions polymer electrolytes cannot deliver oxygen for forming processes. Annealing of defects in the dielectric layer only can be carried out through local overheating and polymer evaporation. The leakage current values for polymer electrolyte capacitors are between 0.2 C_{R}U_{R} to 0.04 C_{R}U_{R}, depending on the manufacturer and series. Thus the value of the leakage current for polymer capacitors is higher than for "wet" Al-e-caps and MnO_{2} Ta-e-caps.

This higher leakage of current disadvantage of solid polymer Al-e-caps is avoided by hybrid Al-e-caps. Their liquid electrolyte provides the oxygen that is necessary for the reforming of oxide defects, so that the hybrids achieve the same values as wet Al-e-caps.

=== Dielectric absorption (soakage) ===
Dielectric absorption occurs when a capacitor that has remained charged for a long time discharges only incompletely when briefly discharged. Although an ideal capacitor would reach zero volts after discharge, real capacitors develop a small voltage from time-delayed dipole discharging, a phenomenon that is also called dielectric relaxation, "soakage" or "battery action".

For polymer tantalum as well as aluminum electrolytic capacitors no figures for dielectric absorption are available.

== Reliability and lifetime ==
=== Reliability (failure rate) ===
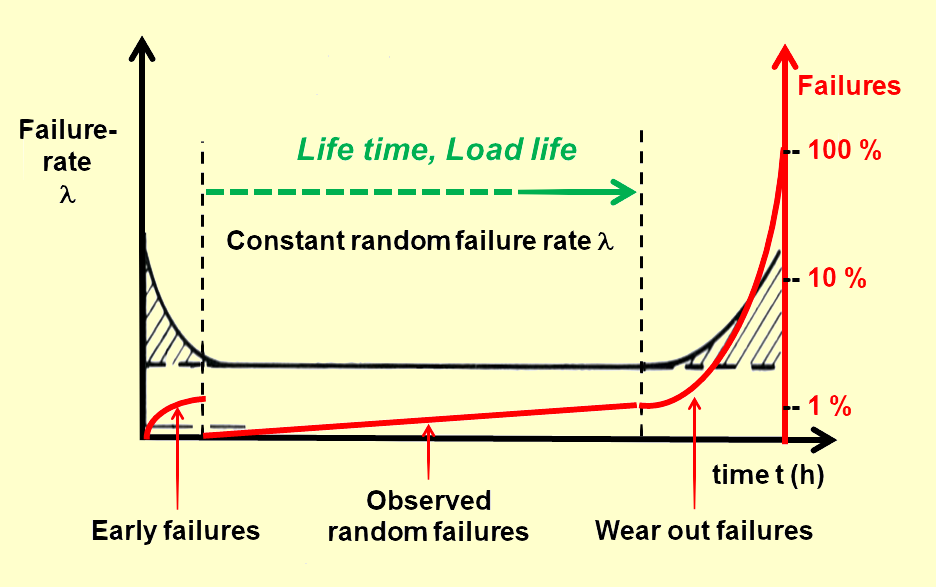
Bathtub curve with times of "early failures", "random failures", and "wear-out failures". The time of random failures is the time of constant failure rate

The reliability of a component is a property that indicates how reliably this component performs its function in a time interval. It is subject to a stochastic process and can be described qualitatively and quantitatively, but is not directly measurable. The reliability of electrolytic capacitors is empirically determined by identifying the failure rate in production accompanying endurance tests. Reliability normally is shown as a bathtub curve and is divided into three areas: early failures or infant mortality failures, constant random failures and wear out failures. Failures totalized in a failure rate are short circuit, open circuit, and degradation failures (exceeding electrical parameters). For polymer Ta-e-caps the failure rate is also influenced by the circuit series resistor, which is not required for polymer Al-e-caps.

Billions of test unit-hours are needed to verify failure rates in the very low level range which are required today to ensure the production of large quantities of components without failures. This requires about a million units tested over a long period, which means a large staff and considerable financing. The tested failure rates are often complemented with feedback from the field from large users (field failure rate), which mostly lowers failure rate estimates

For historical reasons the failure rate units of Ta-e-caps and Al-e-caps are different. For Al-e-caps the reliability prediction is generally expressed in a failure rate λ, with the unit Failures In Time (FIT) at standard operating conditions 40 °C and 0.5 U_{R} during the period of constant random failures. This is the number of failures that can be expected in one billion (10^{9}) component-hours of operation (e.g., 1000 components for 1 million hours, or 1 million components for 1000 hours which is 1 ppm/1000 hours) at the standard operating conditions. This failure rate model implicitly assumes that failures are random. Individual components fail at random times but at a predictable rate. The reciprocal value of FIT is Mean Time Between Failures (MTBF).

For Ta-e-caps the failure rate "F_{Ta}" is specified with the unit "n % failures per 1000 hours" at 85 °C, U = U_{R} and a circuit resistance of 0.1 Ω/V. This is the failure percentage that can be expected in 1000 hours of operation at much more demanding operational conditions compared with the "FIT" model. The failure rates "λ" and "F_{Ta}" depend on operational conditions including temperature, voltage applied, and various environmental factors such as humidity, shocks or vibrations and of the capacitance value of the capacitor. Failure rates are an increasing function of temperature and applied voltage.

Solid Ta-e-caps and "wet" Al-e-caps failure rates can be recalculated with acceleration factors standardized for industrial or military contexts. The latter is established in industry and often used for industrial applications. However, for polymer Ta-e-caps and polymer Al-e-caps no acceleration factors had been published as of 2016. An example of a recalculation from a tantalum capacitor failure rate F_{Ta} into a failure rate λ therefore only can be given by comparing standard capacitors. Example:

A failure rate F_{Ta} = 0.1%/1000 h at 85 °C and U= U_{R} shall be recalculated into a failure rate λ at 40 °C and U = 0,5 U_{R}.

The following acceleration factors from MIL-HDBK 217F are used:

F_{U} = voltage acceleration factor, for U = 0,5 U_{R} is F_{U} = 0.1
F_{T} = temperature acceleration factor, for T = 40 °C is F_{T} = 0.1
F_{R} = acceleration factor for the series resistance R_{V}, at the same value it is = 1

It follows

λ = F_{Ta} x F_{U} x F_{T} x F_{R}
λ = (0.001/1000 h) × 0.1 × 0.1 × 1 = 0.00001/1000 h = 1•10^{−9}/h = 1 FIT

As of 2015 the published failure rate figures for polymer tantalum as well as for polymer aluminum capacitors are in the range of 0.5 to 20 FIT. These reliability levels within the calculated lifetime are comparable with other electronic components and achieve safe operation for decades under normal conditions.

=== Lifetime, service life ===
The life time, service life, load life or useful life of electrolytic capacitors is a special characteristic of non-solid electrolytic capacitors, whose liquid electrolyte can evaporate over the time leading to wear-out failures. Solid tantalum capacitors with MnO_{2} electrolyte have no wear-out mechanism so that the constant failure rate least up to the point all capacitors have failed. They do not have a lifetime specification like non-solid Al-e-caps.

However, polymer tantalum as well as polymer aluminum electrolytic capacitors do have a life time specification. The polymer electrolyte has a small conductivity deterioration by a thermal degradation mechanism of the conductive polymer. The electrical conductivity decreases as a function of time, in agreement with a granular metal type structure, in which aging is due to the shrinking of the conductive polymer grains.

The time of the capacitors functionality (useful life, load life, service life) is tested with a time accelerating endurance test according to IEC 60384-24/-25/-26 with rated voltage at the upper category temperature. Test conditions for passing the test are

- no short circuit or open circuit
- reduction of capacitance by less than 20%
- increase of ESR, impedance or loss factor less than factor of 2

The specified limits for polymer capacitor degradation failures are much closer than for non-solid Al-e-caps. That means, the life time behavior of polymer e-caps are much more stable than for wet Al-e-caps.

The lifetime specification for polymer capacitors is specified in similar terms to non-solid Al-e-caps with a time in hours at maximum voltage and temperature, for example: 2000h/105 °C. This value can be used for an estimation of an operational life time at individual conditions by a formula called "20-degree-rule":

$$L_x =L_\text{Spec}\cdot 10^\frac{T_0-T_A}{20}$$

- L_{x} = life time to be estimated
- L_{Spec} = specified life time (useful life, load life, service life)
- T_{0} = upper category temperature (°C)
- T_{A} = temperature (°C) of the e-cap case or ambient temperature near the capacitor

This rule characterizes the change of thermic polymer reactions speed within the specified degradation limits. According to this formula the theoretical expected service life of a 2000 h/105 °C polymer capacitor, which is operated at 65 °C, can be calculated (better estimated) with about 200,000 hours or approximately 20 years.

For hybrid polymer Al-e-caps the 20-degree rule does not apply. The expected life of these polymer hybrid e-caps can be calculated using the 10-degree rule. For above conditions e-caps with a liquid electrolyte can expect a life time of 32,000 hours or approximately 3.7 years.

=== Failure modes, self-healing mechanism and application rules ===
==== Field crystallization ====
Polymer capacitors, tantalum as well as aluminum, are reliable at the same high level as other electronic components with very low failure rates. However, all tantalum electrolytic capacitors, including polymer tantalum, have a unique failure mode called "field crystallization".

Field crystallization is the major reason for degradation and catastrophic failures of solid tantalum capacitors. More than 90% of the today's rare failures Ta-e-caps are caused by shorts or increased leakage current due to this failure mode.

The extremely thin oxide film of a tantalum electrolytic capacitor, the dielectric layer, must be formed as an amorphous structure. Changing the amorphous structure into a crystallized structure increases conductivity, reportedly by 1,000 times, and also increases the oxide volume.

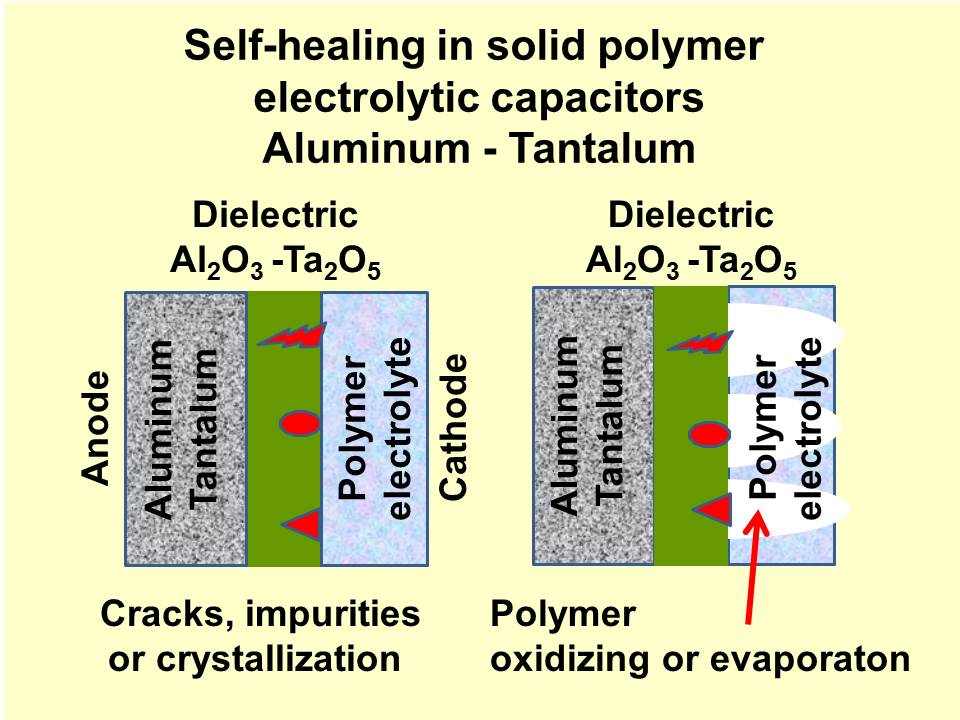
After application of a voltage at weakened spots in the oxide of the capacitor a localized higher leakage current is formed, which leads to a local heating of the polymer, whereby the polymer either oxidized and becomes highly resistive or evaporates.

Field crystallization followed by a dielectric breakdown is characterized by a sudden rise in leakage current, within a few milliseconds, from nano-ampere magnitude to ampere magnitude in low-impedance circuits. Increasing current flow can be accelerate as an "avalanche effect" and rapidly spread through the metal/oxide. This can result in various degrees of destruction ranging from rather small, burned areas on the oxide to zigzag burned streaks covering large areas of the pellet or complete oxidation of the metal. If the current source is unlimited a field crystallization may cause a capacitor short circuit. However, if the current source is limited in solid MnO_{2} Ta-e-caps a self-healing process take place oxidizing MnO_{2} into insulating Mn_{2}O_{3}

In polymer Ta-e-caps combustion is not a risk. Field crystallization may occur, however. In this case, the polymer layer is selectively heated and burned away by the increasing leakage current so that the faulty point is isolated. Since the polymer material does not provide oxygen, the leakage current can not accelerate. However, the faulty area no longer contributes to the capacitors capacitance.

==== Self-healing ====
Polymer Al-e-caps exhibit the same self-healing mechanism as polymer Ta-e-caps. After application of a voltage at weakened spots in the oxide, a localised higher leakage current path is formed. This leads to a local heating of the polymer; whereby the polymer either oxidises and becomes highly resistive – or evaporates. Also, hybrid polymer Al-e-caps show this self-healing mechanism. However, liquid electrolyte can flow to the faulty spot and can deliver oxygen to build up new dielectric oxide. This is the reason for relatively low leakage current values for hybrid polymer capacitors.

==== Application rules ====
The many different types of polymer electrolytic capacitors show differences in electrical long-term behavior, their inherent failure modes, and their self-healing mechanism. To ensure safe operation, manufacturers recommend different application rules, oriented on type behavior, see following table:

Long-term electrical behavior, failure modes, self-healing mechanism, and application rules of the different types of electrolytic capacitors
Type of electrolytic capacitors	Long-term electrical behavior	Failure modes	Self-healing mechanism	Application rules
"Wet" AL-e-caps	Drying out over time, capacitance decreases, ESR increases	No unique determinable	New oxide formed by applying a voltage	Lifetime calculation 10 °C rule
Polymer Al-e-caps	Deterioration of conductivity, ESR increases	No unique determinable	Dielectric fault isolation by oxidation or electrolyte evaporation	Lifetime calculation 20 °C rule
MnO_{2} Ta-e-caps	Stable	Field crystallization	Thermally induced insulating of faults in the dielectric by oxidization of the electrolyte MnO_{2} into insulating MnO_{2}O_{3} if current is limited	Voltage derating 50% Series resistance 3 Ω/V
Polymer Ta-e-caps	Deterioration of conductivity, ESR increases	Field crystallization	Dielectric fault isolation by oxidation or electrolyte evaporation	Voltage derating 20 %
Hybrid polymer Al-e-caps	Deterioration of conductivity, drying out over time, capacitance decreases, ESR increases	No unique determinable	New oxide formed by applying a voltage	Lifetime calculation 10 °C rule

== Additional information ==
=== Capacitor symbol ===
Electrolytic capacitor symbols

Electrolytic capacitor	Electrolytic capacitor	Electrolytic capacitor

=== Polarity marking ===
Polarity marking for polymer electrolytic capacitors

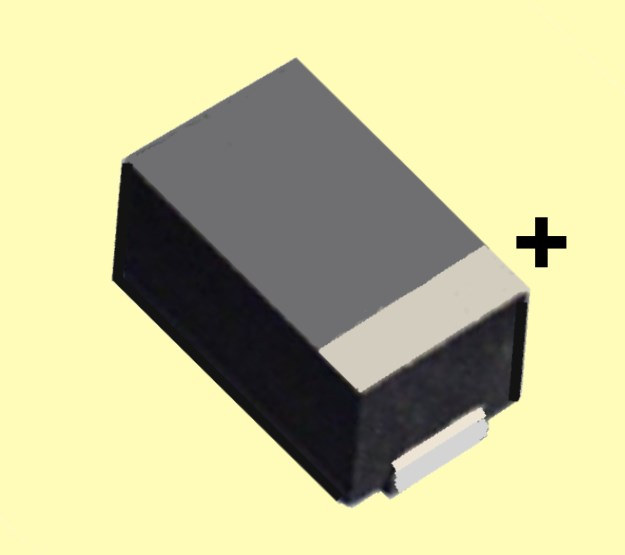

Rectangular polymer capacitors,
tantalum as well as aluminum,
have a polarity marking
at the anode (plus) side

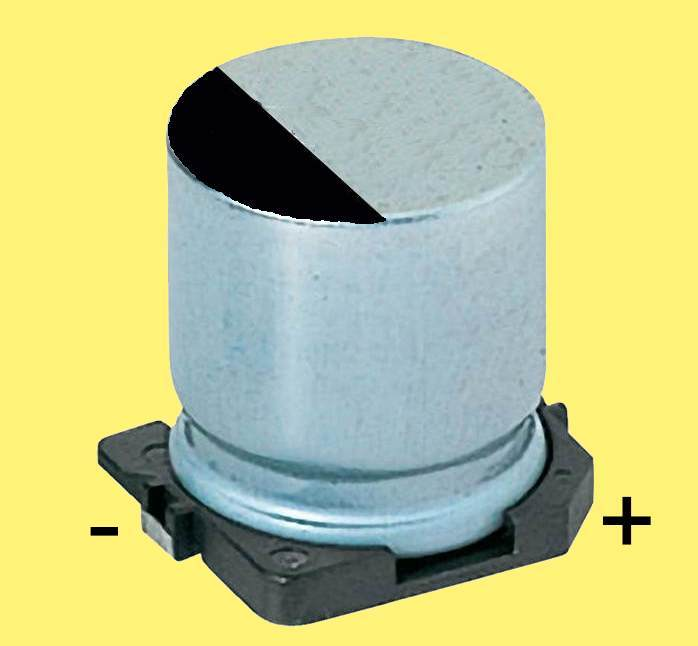

Cylindrical polymer capacitors
have a polarity marking
at the cathode (minus) side

=== Imprinted markings ===
Polymer electrolytic capacitors, given sufficient space, have coded imprinted markings to indicate

- manufacturer's name or trademark;
- manufacturer's type designation;
- polarity
- rated capacitance;
- tolerance on rated capacitance
- rated voltage
- climatic category or rated temperature;
- year and month (or week) of manufacture;

For very small capacitors no marking is possible.

The code of the markings vary by manufacturer.

=== Standardization ===
Electronic components and related technologies standardization follows the rules given by the International Electrotechnical Commission (IEC), a non-profit, non-governmental international standards organization.

The definition of the characteristics and the procedure of the test methods for capacitors for use in electronic equipment are set out in the Generic specification:

- IEC/EN 60384-1 – Fixed capacitors for use in electronic equipment

The tests and requirements to be met by polymer tantalum and polymer aluminum electrolytic capacitors for use in electronic equipment for approval as standardized types are set out in the following sectional specifications:

- IEC/EN 60384-24—Surface mount fixed tantalum electrolytic capacitors with conductive polymer solid electrolyte
- IEC/EN 60384-25—Surface mount fixed aluminium electrolytic capacitors with conductive polymer solid electrolyte
- IEC/EN 60384-26—Fixed aluminium electrolytic capacitors with conductive polymer solid electrolyte

=== Technological competition ===
The ESR and ESL characteristics of polymer electrolytic capacitors are converging to those of MLCC capacitors. Conversely, the specific capacitance of Class 2-MLCC capacitors is approaching that of tantalum chip capacitors. However, apart from this increasing comparability there are arguments in favor of or against certain types of capacitors. Many capacitor manufacturers compose these crucial arguments of their technologies against the competition in presentations and articles, f. e.:

- Al-Polymer e-caps against MLCC: Panasonic
- MLCC against Polymer and "wet" e-caps:Murata
- Al-Polymer e-caps against "wet" e-caps: NCC, NIC
- Ta-Polymer e-caps against standard solid Ta-MnO_{2} e-caps: Kemet

=== Manufacturers and products ===
Worldwide operating manufacturers of polymer electrolytic capacitors and their type spectrum
Manufacturer	Polymer Tantalum capacitors	Polymer Aluminum capacitors		
Manufacturer	rectangular SMD	rectangular SMD	cylindric leaded SMD, V-Chip	cylindric Hybrid Radial, SMD, Axial
AVX	X	-	-	-
CapXon	-	X	X	X
CDE Cornell Dubilier	X	-	-	X
Chinsan, (Elite)	-	-	X	-
Elna	-	-	X	-
Illinois	-	X	X	-
Jianghai	-	-	X	-
KEMET	X	X	X	-
Lelon	-	-	X	-
Matsuo	X	X	-	-
Murata	-	X	-	-
Nippon Chemi-Con	-	-	X	X
NIC	X	-	X	X
Nichicon	-	X	X	-
YMIN	X	X	X	-
Panasonic	X	X	X	X
PolyCap	-	-	X	
ROHM	X	-	-	-
Rubycon	-	X	-	-
Samsung	X	-	-	-
Samwha	-	-	-	X
Sun Electronic (Suncon)	-	-	-	X
TDK	-	-	-	X
Teapo/Luxon	-	-	X	-
Vishay	X	-	-	-
Würth Elektronik eiSos	-	X	X	X
Yageo	-	-	X	

As of July 2016

== See also ==
- Niobium capacitor
- SAL electrolytic capacitor
- Tantalum capacitor
- Capacitor types
