= Equivalent series inductance =

Equivalent series inductance (ESL) is an effective inductance that is used to describe the inductive part of the impedance of certain electrical components.

== Overview ==
The theoretical treatment of devices such as capacitors and resistors tends to assume they are ideal or "perfect" devices, contributing only capacitance or resistance to the circuit. However, all physical devices are connected to a circuit through conductive leads and paths, which contain inherent, usually unwanted, inductance. This means that physical components contain some inductance in addition to their other properties.

An easy way to deal with these inherent inductances in circuit analysis is by using a lumped element model to express each physical component as a combination of an ideal component and a small inductor in series, the inductor having a value equal to the inductance present in the non-ideal, physical device.

== Effects ==
Ideally, the impedance of a capacitor falls with increasing frequency at 20 dB/decade. However, due partly to the inductive properties of the connections, and partly to non-ideal characteristics of the capacitor material, real capacitors also have inductive properties whose impedance rises with frequency at 20 dB/decade. At the resonance frequency the sum of both is minimal, above it the parasitic series inductance of the capacitor dominates.

== See also ==
- Equivalent series resistance (ESR)
