= SAL electrolytic capacitor =

Capacitor with high capacitance in a small package

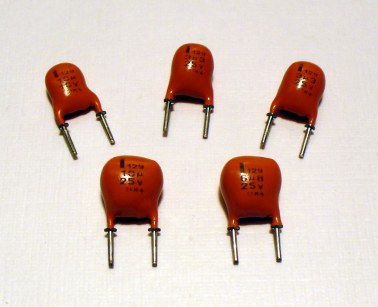
Dipped SAL-pearls, solid aluminum electrolytic capacitors

SAL electrolytic capacitors (SAL meaning solid aluminum) are a form of capacitor developed for high capacitance in a small package, with a long and robust service life. They are aluminum electrolytic capacitors with anodic oxidized aluminum oxide as dielectric and with the semiconducting solid manganese dioxide as electrolyte. They are made of etched and formed aluminum anodes, which are folded for the dipped pearl types or wound into a roll for the axial style. The solid manganese dioxide electrolyte is formed onto this roll in a pyrolytic process, similar to that for solid tantalum capacitors.

SAL-capacitors were developed and introduced in the market in the 1960s by Philips. Up until December 30, 2015, it was a single source product manufactured by Vishay. As of December 31, 2015 these are now end-of-life and have ceased production.

== Construction ==
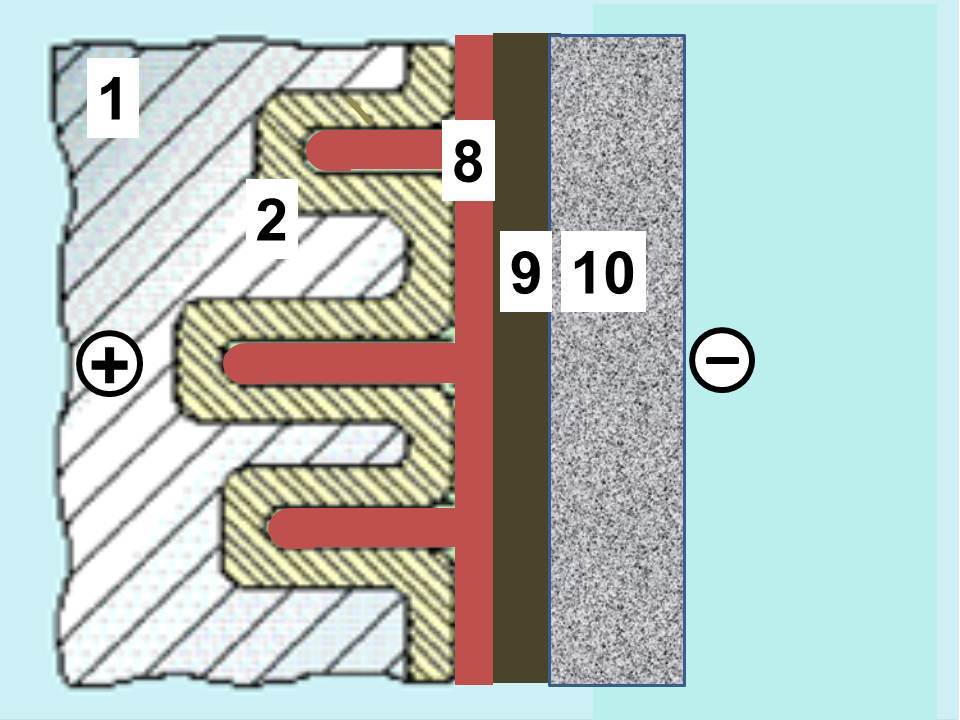
Principle cross section of a SAL capacitor with solid manganese oxide electrolyte, graphite/silver cathode connection, 1: Anode, 2: Al_{2}O_{3}, 8: MnO_{2}, 9: graphite, 10: silver

Basic anode material of solid aluminum capacitors exists of highly purified aluminum with a purity of at least 99.99%. In an electrochemical process the anode material is etched (roughened) to increase the effective electrode surface. After that the roughened aluminum becomes oxidized or formed by an anodic oxidizing process. Thereby an electrical insulating oxide layer Al_{2}O_{3} is formed on the aluminum surface by applying an electric current in correct polarity in an electrolytic bath.

This process of oxide formation is carried out into two reaction steps:

- 2 Al + 6 H_{2}O → 2 Al(OH)_{3} + 3 H_{2} ↑
- 2 Al(OH)_{3} → 2 AlO(OH) + 2 H_{2}O → Al_{2}O_{3} + 3 H_{2}O

The aluminum oxide layer acts as a dielectric. After forming the dielectric the aluminum foils are folded for the dipped style or wound for the axial style, and then provided with electrolyte, the capacitor's cathode. The electrolyte used in SAL capacitors is a solid state oxide semiconductor, manganese dioxide (MnO_{2}). This electrolyte is formed by pyrolysing of the liquid manganese nitrate into the solid manganese dioxide:

- Mn(NO_{3})_{2} • 6 H_{2}O → MnO_{2} + 2 NO_{2} + 6 H_{2}O

After the pyrolising process the capacitor cell is reformed again to heal all impurities or cracks caused during the pyrolising process.

Manganese dioxide is a hard, black crystalline substance. It has a fairly good electrical conductivity and has an excellent long-term stability. In an ideal case it covers 100% of the dielectric layer and acts as a solid cathode in the solid electrolytic capacitor.

For contact purposes, a layer of carbon from a graphite dispersion is put on the MnO_{2} coating on the surface of the capacitor cell. Onto this a metallic conductive silver epoxy lacquer is applied. The graphite layer also prevents a direct contact between manganese dioxide and silver. Direct contact between these two materials forces a chemical reaction which oxidizes the silver and reduces manganese dioxide into high resistive manganese(III) oxide resulting in increasing ESR of the capacitor. This silver layer now can be contacted with the cathode terminal of the capacitor.

== Characteristics ==
Solid aluminum electrolytic capacitors have no known inherent wear-out failure mechanism. In addition the solid electrolyte offers a very long time stability of the electrical and thermal characteristics. They remain constant throughout a very long time without time-depending changes. The dependence of the impedance and equivalent series resistance (ESR) at lower temperatures is very low compared with non-solid electrolytes. The capacitors are insensitive to high inrush or switch-off currents and can be operated without a series resistor, whereby the SAL electrolytic capacitors at high current loads have a much higher reliability with respect to tantalum electrolytic capacitors. In addition, the dielectric aluminum oxide in combination with the electrolyte manganese dioxide has a relatively high voltage resistance against wrong polarity.

== Applications ==
SAL electrolytic capacitors are used for filtering, smoothing coupling and decoupling applications in industrial, medical and automotive equipment. The axial style of SAL capacitors has military and high professional applications up to 200 °C.

== Advantages and disadvantages ==
Compared to non-solid electrolytic capacitors, SAL capacitors:

- are lower ESR,
- can withstand higher ripple currents,
- have smaller changes in impedance and ESR at low temperatures,
- have no evaporation of the electrolyte,
- have better life-time limits,
- can withstand higher inrush currents,
- and are more expensive.

Compared to polymer electrolytic capacitors, SAL capacitors:

- have a higher ESR,
- have a lower specified maximum ripple current load,
- are a single source product,
- and are more expensive.

== Standardization ==
The standardization for all electrical, electronic components and related technologies follows the rules given by the International Electrotechnical Commission (IEC), a non-profit, non-governmental international standards organization. The definition of the characteristics and the procedure of the test methods for aluminum electrolytic capacitors for use in electronic equipment are set out in the generic specification:

- IEC 60384-1, Fixed capacitors for use in electronic equipment - Part 1: Generic specification

The tests and requirements to be met by capacitors for use in electronic equipment for approval as standardized types are set out in the following sectional specifications

- IEC 60384-4, Fixed capacitors for use in electronic equipment - Part 4: Sectional specification - Aluminium electrolytic capacitors with solid (MnO_{2}) and non-solid electrolyte
- IEC 60384-18, Fixed capacitors for use in electronic equipment - Part 18: Sectional specification - Fixed aluminium electrolytic surface mount capacitors with solid (MnO_{2}) and non-solid electrolyte

== See also ==
- Polymer capacitor
- Types of capacitor
