= Barrel plating =

Method of electroplating large quantities of small metal objects

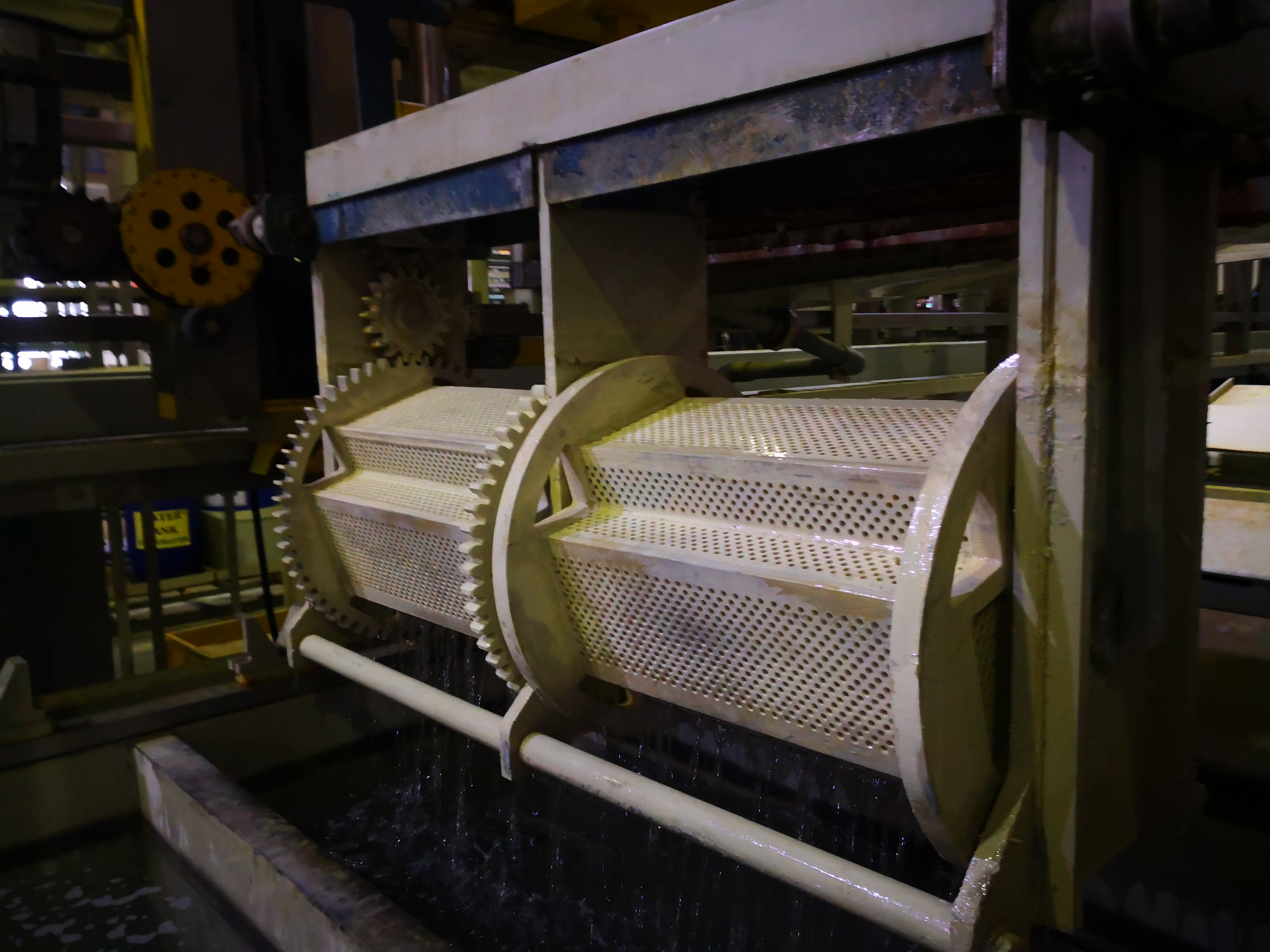
Barrel plating for electrical components (e.g. ceramic capacitors) used to grow terminals.

Barrel plating is a form of electroplating used for plating a large number of smaller metal objects in one sitting. It consists of a non-conductive barrel-shaped cage in which the objects are placed before being subjected to the chemical bath in which they become plated. An important aspect of the barrel plating process is that the individual pieces establish a bipolar contact with one another — this results in high plating efficiency. However, because of the large amount of surface contact that the pieces have with each other, barrel plating is generally not recommended when precisely engineered or ornamental finishes are required.

Barrel plating began as a practice in the United States during the US Civil War. The harsh chemicals required, however, meant that it had to await the development of non-conductive and chemically resistant plastics— primarily acrylic and polypropylene— before it could receive widespread use. By 2004, however, barrel plating had become widespread: it was estimated that as much as 70% of modern electroplating facilities used barrel plating techniques at that time.
