= Tape casting =

Casting process for ceramics

Tape casting (also called doctor blading and knife coating) is a casting process used in the manufacture of thin ceramic tapes and sheets from ceramic slurry. The ceramic slurry is cast in a thin layer onto a flat surface and then dried and sintered. It is a part of powder metallurgy.

== History ==
Tape casting was first described as a method to mass-produce capacitors. In this first published description from 1947, the process was described as:

"A machine is described which extrudes a ceramic slip with a resin binder on a moving belt. The thin sheet is strong enough when dry to be stripped off and cut or punched to any desired flat shape and fired satisfactorily."

In 1960, a patent was filed for multilayered tape casting, and in 1996, the first tapes under 5 μm were cast.

== Production process ==
Schematic representation of the tape-casting process. The slurry is brown, the doctor knife is grey, and the arrow-headed line is the surface on which the slurry is applied and its moving direction. This is just one of many different designs.

The tape-casting process converts ceramic powder to a thin film by making a liquid form of it, casting it on a flat plane, and drying it. The process involves several key steps:

Preparation of the slurry
The raw material, typically ceramic powder, is mixed with solvents, dispersants, binders, plasticizers, and other additives to form a uniformly dispersed and stable slurry.
Casting the slurry
The slurry is then cast onto a flat surface using a tape casting machine. The machine spreads the slurry into a thin film of the required thickness.
Drying
The cast film, known as the green tape, is dried to remove the solvents. This step is crucial to ensure the tape maintains its shape and integrity.
Cutting and punching
The dried green tape is cut or punched into the desired shapes. This step is often used to create multilayer structures for electronic and energetic applications.
Lamination
Multiple layers of green tape can be stacked and laminated together under specific conditions of temperature, pressure, and dwell time to form a cohesive structure.
Sintering
The laminated structure is then sintered at high temperatures to achieve the final desired properties, such as mechanical strength and electrical conductivity.

Different casting mechanisms, such as doctor blades, slot-die coaters, and microgravure coaters, are used to achieve the desired thickness and surface quality of the tape.

=== Ingredients ===
The starting point for the tape casting process is the powder that the tape is to consist of, as the active component of the final product. The other contents, such as binder material and solvents, must be compatible with the powder. The powder is in general very fine, with maximum particle sizes of 5 micrometers. The solvent serves the purpose of allowing the powder to be cast, as if it were a liquid, and also to spread secondary components through the tape. Surfactants are added as well, to control the behaviour of the tape surface. A binder material is also added. This determines the bulk structure and mechanical characteristics of the tape.

=== Slurry manufacturing ===
Ceramic tape-casting slurries are complex systems composed of ceramic powder, solvent, and a number of organic components. A ceramic slurry's different ingredients each have a different impact on the rheological behavior of the slurry. The main ingredient in any slurry formulation is a powder; this is the only ingredient which determines the properties of a shaped material.

=== Slurry casting ===
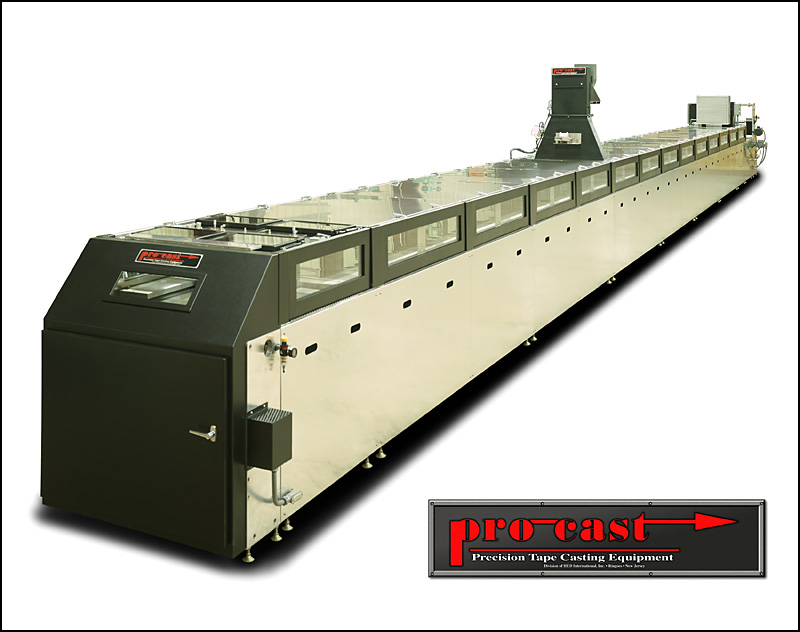
Tape-casting machine

The slip material is transported in pipes from tanks to the casting machine. The slip may be filtered before being applied, to remove imperfect particles. The cast slurry is called a green layer or green sheet (this does not refer to the colour of the sheet), and needs further processing such as cutting and drying.

During casting, it is important to cast a perfectly flat surface without streaks; for this, different casting mechanisms have been designed to minimise slip streams in the slurry. The blades that flatten and thin the cast surface are called doctor blades. These come in different shapes such as thick or thin flat cutting surfaces, rounded edges, and knife-blade-shaped edges. For tapes that are cast thinner than 50 micrometers, the coating is not applied from the top, but from the side (slot-die coater) or bottom (lip coater and microgravure coater).

The surface that the tape is cast on can be made from steel, glass, coated paper, and polymers. Steel is the most economical surface, but removal of thin sheets from a steel surface is difficult, and the steel surface needs relatively frequent replacement due to damage.

=== Green sheet drying ===
The cast tape dries from only one side, the exposed surface, as the casting surface is impermeable. Drying is dependent on two processes: evaporation of the solvent from the surface and diffusion of the solvent through the tape towards the single exposed surface. The evaporation may be sped up by applying air drying. However, usually evaporation should be limited to ensure steady diffusion of the solvent. If the solvent does not leave the sheet in a controlled fashion, then the tape may crack or curl.

Several processing steps may be executed depending on the product requirement, such as cutting, laminating, punching, or thermal treatment.

== Usage ==
The process is used in the production of ceramic capacitors, polymer batteries, photovoltaics, and electrodes for molten carbonate fuel cells. Films as thin as 5 micrometers can be produced using tape casting.
