= Bleeder resistor =

Type of electronic component

In electronics, a bleeder resistor, bleeder load, leakage resistor, capacitor discharge resistor or safety discharge resistor is a resistor connected in parallel with the output of a high-voltage power supply circuit for the purpose of discharging the electric charge stored in the power supply's filter capacitors when the equipment is turned off, for safety reasons. It eliminates the possibility of a leftover charge causing electric shock if people handle or service the equipment in the off state, believing it is safe. A bleeder resistor is usually a standard resistor rather than a specialized component.

== Operation ==
Power supply circuits in electronic equipment that use rectifier circuits to produce direct current (DC) from the alternating current (AC) supplied by mains use filter capacitors to smooth the DC current. A large electric charge can remain in these capacitors after the unit is turned off, constituting a shock hazard. These must typically store enough energy at this high voltage to power the load during the zero crossings of the AC input. In addition, the capacitors in many supplies are made large enough to supply the load during AC outages lasting for a significant fraction of a second.

This stored charge, which is often enough to deliver a lethal shock, can remain in the capacitors for a long time after the unit has been turned off. It can be a potentially lethal shock hazard for the user or maintenance and servicing personnel, who may believe that because the device is turned off or unplugged it is safe. Therefore, to discharge the capacitor after the supply has been turned off, a large value resistor is connected across its terminals. After it is switched off, the charge on the capacitor will slowly drain off through this "bleeder resistor", causing the voltage to decay quickly to safe levels.

While the power supply is on, a small current flows through the bleeder resistor, wasting a small amount of power and reducing the efficiency of the power supply. The value of the resistor is chosen to be high enough that the resistor will not consume too much power while the supply is on, but low enough that the charge on the capacitor bleeds off quickly.

Bleeder resistors have a second advantage: In some designs, if the load on the power supply should become disconnected, the filter capacitors will overcharge without any discharge path, potentially damaging them or the power supply. The addition of a bleeder resistor provides a discharge path to alleviate this voltage rise, improving the voltage regulation of the filter.

== Usage ==
Switched-mode power supplies use a bridge rectifier to convert mains AC power into DC at 320 V (for 220 V mains) or 160 V (for 115 V mains), before the voltage is reduced by the chopper. These incorporate one or more filter capacitors to smooth the pulsing output voltage from the rectifier. The capacitors in high voltage DC power supplies used in devices such as lasers, x-ray machines, electronic flashes, radio transmitters, and old style CRT computer monitors and televisions can have higher, more dangerous voltages.

=== High-voltage supply in television sets ===
The high-voltage power supplies of CRT-type television sets and computer monitors can generate voltages between 30 kV - 40 kV, which are a much greater electrocution hazard. This higher voltage requires higher value bleeder resistors to avoid unnecessarily loading the supply circuits. The bleeder resistor, commonly found inside a flyback transformer, is valued in the hundreds of megaohms range and therefore cannot be measured directly with the common technician's multimeter.

Instead of a resistor inside the transformer, the focus and screen control array may be used for the same purpose, depending on the application and tolerances of the type of tube it is producing output for.

These bleeders discharge the focus supply, but not the high-voltage final anode feed. The CRT itself forms a capacitor that can hold a sizable (and very dangerous) high-voltage charge, so it is always advisable to momentarily ground a CRT's high-voltage terminal before working on the unit.

== Design considerations ==
There is always a trade-off between the speed with which the bleeder operates and the amount of power wasted in the bleeder; a lower resistance value results in a faster bleed-down rate but wastes more power during normal, power-on operation.

The presence of a bleeder also guarantees a minimum load on the power source, which can help reduce the range of voltage change (regulation) when the normal load is changing and there is no active regulator. Use of a bleeder this way is a common design strategy for power supplies of vacuum tube power amplifiers, for instance.

Large capacitors can actually recover a substantial part of their charge after being discharged by the bleeder resistor, if the resistor is not left in place. This is due to a property called dielectric absorption, in which energy stored in the dielectric during use is released gradually over time through dielectric relaxation; therefore the bleeder should ideally be connected permanently.

== Failure ==
The failure of a bleeder resistor prevents the discharge of the capacitors, resulting in dangerous voltages being retained for many days. This is one of several reasons for the typical warning on most equipment: "Warning – No user-serviceable parts inside". An unsuspecting user may get an electrical shock from opened equipment due to failure of a bleeder resistor, or the common practice of not fitting them, long after the device has been turned off or unplugged.

Safe design suggests mounting a bleeder close to a dangerous capacitor, ideally directly to the capacitor terminals, and not through any connectors, so that it is difficult to disconnect the bleeder accidentally. Some safety capacitors have built-in capacitor discharge resistors.

Despite the presence of a bleeder, it is wise to prove that any potentially dangerous capacitors are discharged, perhaps by shorting their terminals (or through a suitable low discharge resistance for high energy capacitors), before working on any circuit.

== Dual bleeder ==
Because of the speed/power tradeoff, high-powered circuits may use two separate bleeder circuits. A fast bleed circuit is switched out during normal operation so that no power is wasted; when power is switched off, the fast bleeder is connected, rapidly bleeding down the voltage. The switch controlling the fast bleeder can fail, either by connecting when it shouldn't (and overheating) or by not connecting when it should (and thereby failing to bleed off the voltage quickly). To avoid the risk of not having an operational bleeder, a secondary, slower (and less lossy) bleeder is usually permanently connected so that there is always some bleed-down capability.

== See also ==
- Antistatic device
- Bleeder bias
- Idle current
- Load resistor
- Standby power
- Static eliminator
