= Film capacitor =

Electrical capacitor with an insulating plastic film as the dielectric

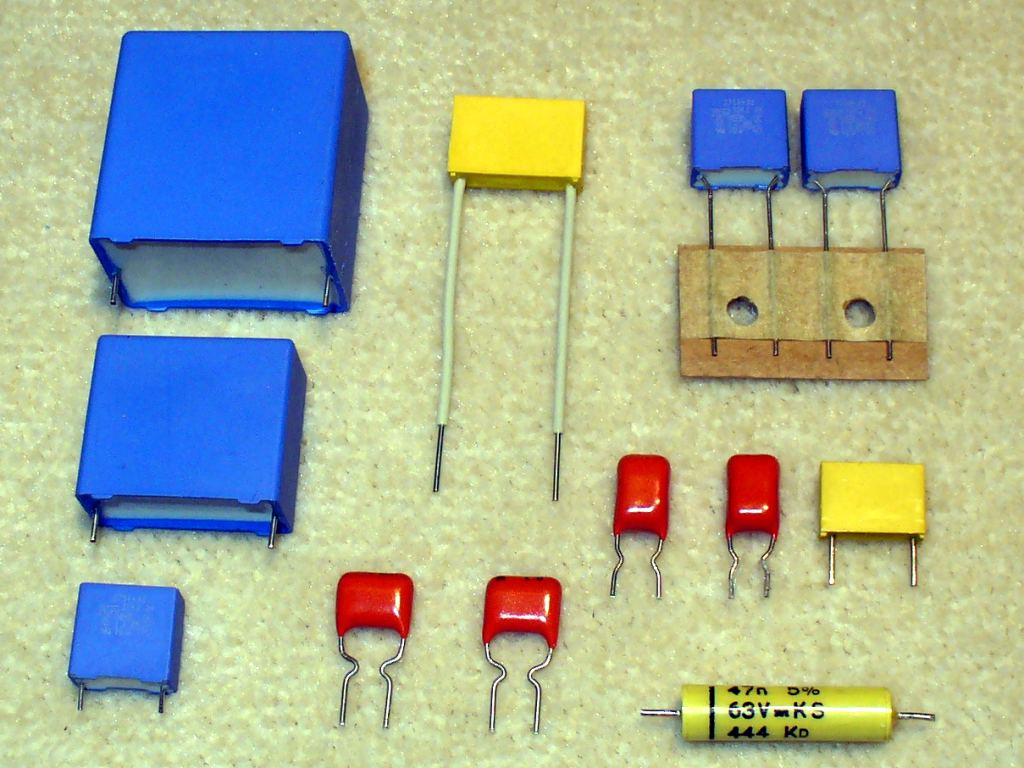
Plastic film capacitors potted in rectangular casings, or dipped in epoxy lacquer coating (red color)

Film capacitors, plastic film capacitors, film dielectric capacitors, or polymer film capacitors, generically called film caps as well as power film capacitors, are electrical capacitors with an insulating plastic film as the dielectric, sometimes combined with paper as carrier of the electrodes.

The dielectric films, depending on the desired dielectric strength, are drawn in a special process to an extremely thin thickness, and are then provided with electrodes. The electrodes of film capacitors may be metallized aluminum or zinc applied directly to the surface of the plastic film, or a separate metallic foil. Two of these conductive layers are wound into a cylinder-shaped winding, usually flattened to reduce mounting space requirements on a printed circuit board, or layered as multiple single layers stacked together, to form a capacitor body. Film capacitors, together with ceramic capacitors and electrolytic capacitors, are the most common capacitor types for use in electronic equipment, and are used in many AC and DC microelectronics and electronics circuits.

A related component type is the power (film) capacitor. Although the materials and construction techniques used for large power film capacitors are very similar to those used for ordinary film capacitors, capacitors with high to very high power ratings for applications in power systems and electrical installations are often classified separately, for historical reasons. As modern electronic equipment gained the capacity to handle power levels that were previously the exclusive domain of "electrical power" components, the distinction between the "electronic" and "electrical" power ratings has become less distinct. In the past, the boundary between these two families was approximately at a reactive power of 200 volt-amperes, but modern power electronics can handle increasing power levels.

== Overview of construction and features ==
Internals of film capacitors

Schematic picture comparison of film/foil vs. metallized film capacitor internals

Cross-section of a plastic film capacitor

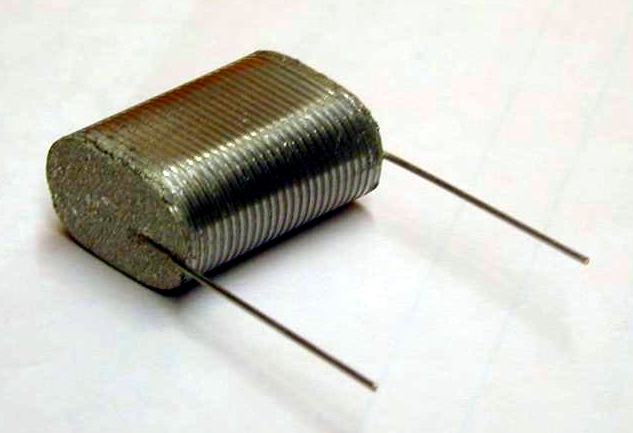
Flattened winding of a "naked" film capacitor before encasement, with a view of collateral metal contact layers ("schoopage") and attached terminals

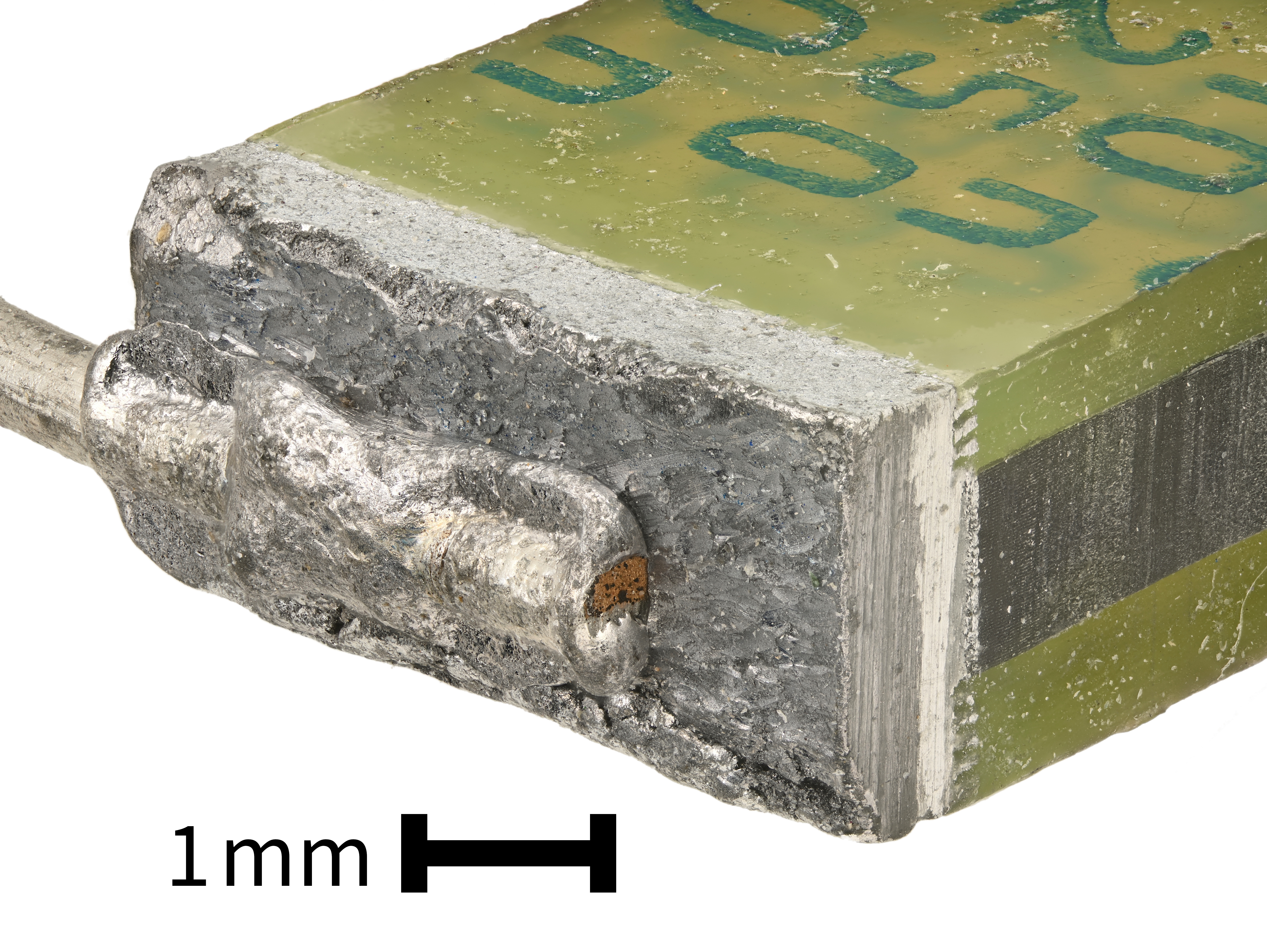
Close-up of schoopage and terminal of stacked film capacitor

Film capacitors are made out of two pieces of plastic film covered with metallic electrodes, wound into a cylindrical shaped winding, with terminals attached, and then encapsulated. In general, film capacitors are not polarized, so the two terminals are interchangeable. There are two different types of plastic film capacitors, made with two different electrode configurations:

- Film/foil capacitors or metal foil capacitors are made with two plastic films as the dielectric. Each is layered with a thin metal foil, usually aluminum, as the electrodes. Advantages of this construction type are easy electrical connection to the metal foil electrodes, and its ability to handle high current surges.
- Metallized film capacitors are made of two metallized films with plastic film as the dielectric. A very thin (~ 0.03 μm) vacuum-deposited aluminum metallization is applied to one or both sides to serve as electrodes. This configuration can have "self-healing" properties, in that dielectric breakdowns or short circuits between the electrodes do not necessarily lead to the destruction of the component. With this basic design, it is possible to make high quality products such as "zero defect" capacitors and to produce wound capacitors with larger capacitance values (up to 100 μF and larger) in smaller cases (high volumetric efficiency) compared to film/foil construction. However, a disadvantage of metallized construction is its limited current surge rating.

A key advantage of modern film capacitor internal construction is direct contact to the electrodes on both ends of the winding. This contact keeps all current paths to the entire electrode very short. The setup behaves like a large number of individual capacitors connected in parallel, thus reducing the internal ohmic losses (ESR) and the parasitic inductance (ESL). The inherent geometry of film capacitor structure results in very low ohmic losses and a very low parasitic inductance, which makes them especially suitable for applications with very high surge currents (snubbers) and for AC power applications, or for applications at higher frequencies.

Another feature of film capacitors is the possibility of choosing different film materials for the dielectric layer to select for desirable electrical characteristics, such as stability, wide temperature range, or ability to withstand very high voltages. Polypropylene film capacitors are specified because of their low electrical losses and their nearly linear behavior over a very wide frequency range, for stability Class 1 applications in resonant circuits, comparable only with ceramic capacitors. For simple high frequency filter circuits, polyester capacitors offer low-cost solutions with excellent long-term stability, allowing replacement of more expensive tantalum electrolytic capacitors. The film/foil variants of plastic film capacitors are especially capable of handling high and very high current surges.

Typical capacitance values of smaller film capacitors used in electronics start around 100 picofarads and extend upwards to microfarads.

Unique mechanical properties of plastic and paper films in some special configurations allow them to be used in capacitors of very large dimensions. The larger film capacitors are used as power capacitors in electrical power installations and plants, capable of withstanding very high power or very high applied voltages. The dielectric strength of these capacitors can reach into the four-digit voltage range.

== Internal structure ==
The formula for capacitance (C) of a plate capacitor is:
$C=\varepsilon \cdot { {A} \over {d} }$
(ε stands for dielectric permittivity; A for electrode surface area; and d for the distance between the electrodes).

According to the equation, a thinner dielectric or a larger electrode area both will increase the capacitance value, as will a dielectric material of higher permittivity.

=== Example manufacturing process ===
The following example describes a typical manufacturing process flow for wound metallized plastic film capacitors.

1. Film stretching and metallization — To increase the capacitance value of the capacitor, the plastic film is drawn using a special extrusion process of bi-axial stretching in longitudinal and transverse directions, as thin as is technically possible and as allowed by the desired breakdown voltage. The thickness of these films can be as little as 0.6 μm. In a suitable evaporation system and under high vacuum conditions (about 10^{15} to 10^{19} molecules of air per cubic meter) the plastic film is metallized with aluminum or zinc. It is then wound onto a so-called "mother roll" with a width of about 1 meter.
2. Film slitting — Next, the mother rolls are slit into small strips of plastic film in the required width according to the size of the capacitors being manufactured.
3. Winding — Two films are rolled together into a cylindrical winding. The two metallized films that make up a capacitor are wound slightly offset from each other, so that by the arrangement of the electrodes one edge of the metallization on each end of the winding extends out laterally.
4. Flattening — The winding is usually flattened into an oval shape by applying mechanical pressure. Because the cost of a printed circuit board is calculated per square millimeter, a smaller capacitor footprint reduces the overall cost of the circuit.
5. Application of metallic contact layer ("schoopage") — The projecting end electrodes are covered with a liquefied contact metal (such as tin, zinc or aluminum), which is sprayed with compressed air on both lateral ends of the winding. This metallizing process is named schoopage after Swiss engineer Max Schoop, who invented a combustion spray application for tin and lead.
6. Healing — The windings which are now electrically connected by the schoopage have to be "healed". This is done by applying a precisely calibrated voltage across the electrodes of the winding so that any existing defects will be "burned away" (see also "self-healing" below).
7. Impregnation — For increased protection of the capacitor against environmental influences, especially moisture, the winding is impregnated with an insulating fluid, such as silicone oil.
8. Attachment of terminals — The terminals of the capacitor are soldered or welded on the end metal contact layers of the schoopage.
9. Coating — After attaching the terminals, the capacitor body is potted into an external casing, or is dipped into a protective coating. For lowest production costs some film capacitors can be used "naked", without further coating of the winding.
10. Electrical final test — All capacitors (100%) should be tested for the most important electrical parameters, capacitance (C), dissipation factor (tan δ) and impedance (Z).

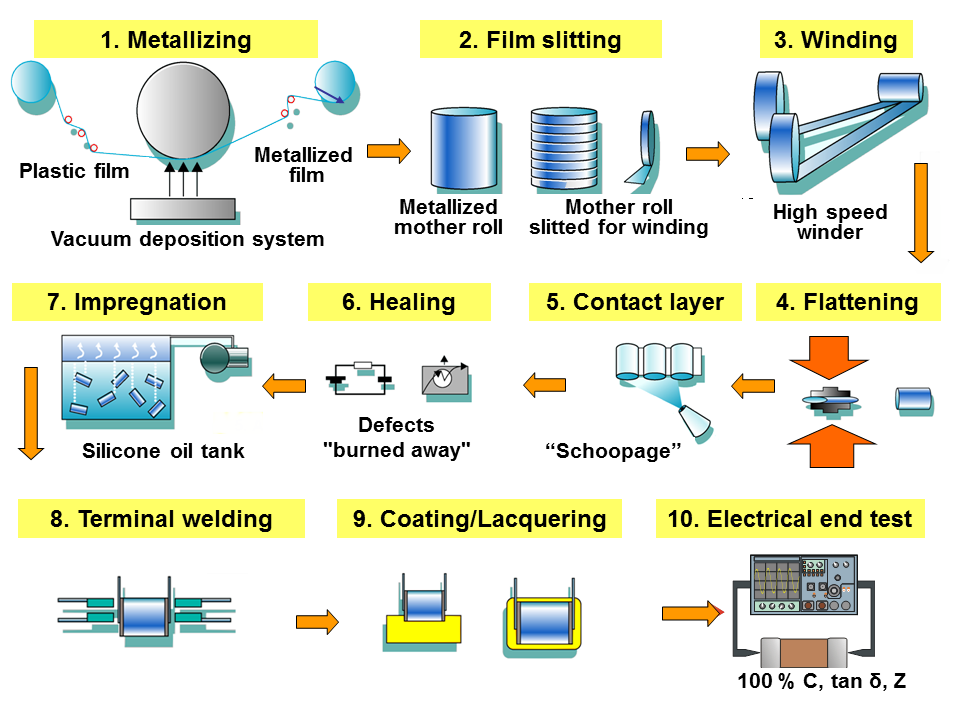
Process flow diagram for production of metallized film capacitors with dipped lacquered coating

The production of wound film/metal foil capacitors with metal foil instead of metallized films is done in a very similar way.

As an alternative to the traditional wound construction of film capacitors, they can also be manufactured in a "stacked" configuration. For this version, the two metallized films representing the electrodes are wound on a much larger core with a diameter of more than 1 m. So-called multi-layer capacitors (MLP, Multilayer Polymer Capacitors) can be produced by sawing this large winding into many smaller single segments. The sawing causes defects on the collateral sides of the capacitors which are later burned out (self-healing) during the manufacturing process. Low-cost metallized plastic film capacitors for general purpose applications are produced in this manner. This technique is also used to produce capacitor "dice" for Surface Mount Device (SMD) packaged components.

=== Self-healing of metallized film capacitors ===
Highly simplified cross-section diagram of self-healing, after a point-defect short-circuit between the metallized electrodes is burned out. Lower diagram shows top view of foil after burn-out of a point defect.

"T metallization" segmentation to isolate and reduce damage during the self-healing process

Metallized film capacitors have "self-healing" properties, which are not available from film/foil configurations. When sufficient voltage is applied, a point-defect short-circuit between the metallized electrodes vaporizes due to high arc temperature, since both the dielectric plastic material at the breakdown point and the metallized electrodes around the breakdown point are very thin (about 0.02 to 0.05 μm). The point-defect cause of the short-circuit is burned out, and the resulting vapor pressure blows the arc away, too. This process can complete in less than 10 μs, often without interrupting the useful operation of the afflicted capacitor.

This property of self-healing allows the use of a single-layer winding of metallized films without any additional protection against defects, and thereby leads to a reduction in the amount of the physical space required to achieve a given performance specification. In other words, the so-called "volumetric efficiency" of the capacitor is increased.

The self-healing capability of metallized films is used multiple times during the manufacturing process of metallized film capacitors. Typically, after slitting the metallized film to the desired width, any resulting defects can be burned out (healed) by applying a suitable voltage before winding. The same method is also used after the metallization of the contact surfaces ("schoopage") to remove any defects in the capacitor caused by the secondary metallization process.

The "pinholes" in the metallization caused by the self-healing arcs reduce the capacitance of the capacitor very slightly. However, the magnitude of this reduction is quite low; even with several thousand defects to be burned out, this reduction usually is much smaller than 1% of the total capacitance of the capacitor.

For larger film capacitors with very high standards for stability and long lifetime, such as snubber capacitors, the metallization can be made with a special fault isolation pattern. In the picture on the right hand side, such a metallization formed into a "T" pattern is shown. Each of these "T" patterns produces a deliberately narrowed cross-section in the conductive metallization. These restrictions work like microscopic fuses so that if a point-defect short-circuit between the electrodes occurs, the high current of the short only burns out the fuses around the fault. The affected sections are thus disconnected and isolated in a controlled manner, without any explosions surrounding a larger short-circuit arc. Therefore, the area affected is limited and the fault is gently controlled, significantly reducing internal damage to the capacitor, which can thus remain in service with only an infinitesimal reduction in capacitance.

In field installations of electrical power distribution equipment, capacitor bank fault tolerance is often improved by connecting multiple capacitors in parallel, each protected with an internal or external fuse. Should an individual capacitor develop an internal short, the resulting fault current (augmented by capacitive discharge from neighboring capacitors) blows the fuse, thus isolating the failed capacitor from the remaining devices. This technique is analogous to the "T metallization" technique described above, but operating at a larger physical scale. More-complex series and parallel arrangements of capacitor banks are also used to allow continuity of service despite individual capacitor failures at this larger scale.

=== Internal structure to increase voltage ratings ===
Examples of partial metallization on one side of the metallized insulating film, to increase the voltage rating of film capacitors. This technique effectively forms multiple small capacitors, connected in series, to raise the effective breakdown voltage

The rated voltage of different film materials depends on factors such as the thickness of the film, the quality of the material (freedom from physical defects and chemical impurities), the ambient temperature, and frequency of operation, plus a safety margin against the breakdown voltage (dielectric strength). But to a first approximation, the voltage rating of a film capacitor depends primarily on the thickness of the plastic film. For example, with the minimum available film thickness of polyester film capacitors (about 0.7 μm), it is possible to produce capacitors with a rated voltage of 400 VDC. If higher voltages are needed, typically a thicker plastic film will be used. But the breakdown voltage for dielectric films is usually nonlinear. For thicknesses greater than about 5 mils (~ 127 μm), the breakdown voltage only increases approximately with the square-root of the film thickness. On the other hand, the capacitance decreases linearly with increased film thickness. For reasons of availability, storage and existing processing capabilities, it is desirable to achieve higher breakdown voltages while using existing available film materials. This can be achieved by a one-sided partial metallization of the insulating films in such a manner that an internal series connection of capacitors is produced. By using this series connection technique, the total breakdown voltage of the capacitor can be multiplied by an arbitrary factor, but the total capacitance is also reduced by the same factor.

The breakdown voltage can be increased by using one-sided partially metallized films, or the breakdown voltage of the capacitor can be increased by using double-sided metallized films. Double-sided metallized films also can be combined with internal series-connected capacitors by partial metallization. These multiple technique designs are especially used for high-reliability applications with polypropylene films.

Increasing the breakdown voltage of film capacitors by using double sided metallized foils

Metallized polycarbonate film capacitor with double sided metallized films

High voltage capacitor with two capacitors internally series-connected

High voltage capacitor with four capacitors internally series-connected

=== Internal structure to increase surge ratings ===
An important property of film capacitors is their ability to withstand high peak voltage or peak current surge pulses. This capability depends on all internal connections of the film capacitor withstanding the peak current loads up to the maximum specified temperature. The collateral contact layers (schoopage) with the electrodes can be a potential limitation of peak current carrying capacity.

The electrode layers are wound slightly offset from each other, so that the edges of the electrodes can be contacted using a face contacting method "schoopage" at the collateral end faces of the winding. This internal connection is ultimately made by multiple point-shaped contacts at the edge of the electrode, and can be modeled as a large number of individual capacitors all connected in parallel. The many individual resistance (ESR) and inductance (ESL) losses are connected in parallel, so that these total undesirable parasitic losses are minimized.

However, ohmic contact resistance heating is generated when peak current flows through these individual microscopic contacting points, which are critical areas for the overall internal resistance of the capacitor. If the current gets too high, "hot spots" can develop and cause burning of the contact areas.

A second limitation of the current-carrying capacity is caused by the ohmic bulk resistance of the electrodes themselves. For metallized film capacitors, which have layer thicknesses from 0.02 to 0.05 μm the current-carrying capacity is limited by these thin layers.

Shape-optimized metallization to increase the surge current rating

The surge current rating of film capacitors can be enhanced by various internal configurations. Because metallization is the cheapest way of producing electrodes, optimizing the shape of the electrodes is one way to minimize the internal resistance and to increase the current-carrying capacity. A slightly thicker metallization layer at the schoopage contact sides of the electrodes results in a lower overall contact resistance and increased surge current handling, without losing the self-healing properties throughout the remainder of the metallization.

Another technique to increase the surge current rating for film capacitors is a double-sided metallization. This can double the peak current rating. This design also halves the total self-inductance of the capacitor, because in effect, two inductors are connected in parallel, which allows less-unimpeded passage of faster pulses (higher so-called "dV/dt" rating).

The double-sided metallized film is electrostatically field-free because the electrodes have the same voltage potential on both sides of the film, and therefore does not contribute to the total capacitance of the capacitor. This film can therefore be made of a different and less expensive material. For example, a polypropylene film capacitor with double-sided metallization on a polyester film carrier makes the capacitor not only cheaper but also smaller, because the thinner polyester foil improves the volumetric efficiency of the capacitor. Film capacitors with a double-sided metallized film effectively have thicker electrodes for higher surge current handling, but still do retain their self-healing properties, in contrast to the film/foil capacitors.

== Styles of film capacitors ==
Available styles of film capacitors

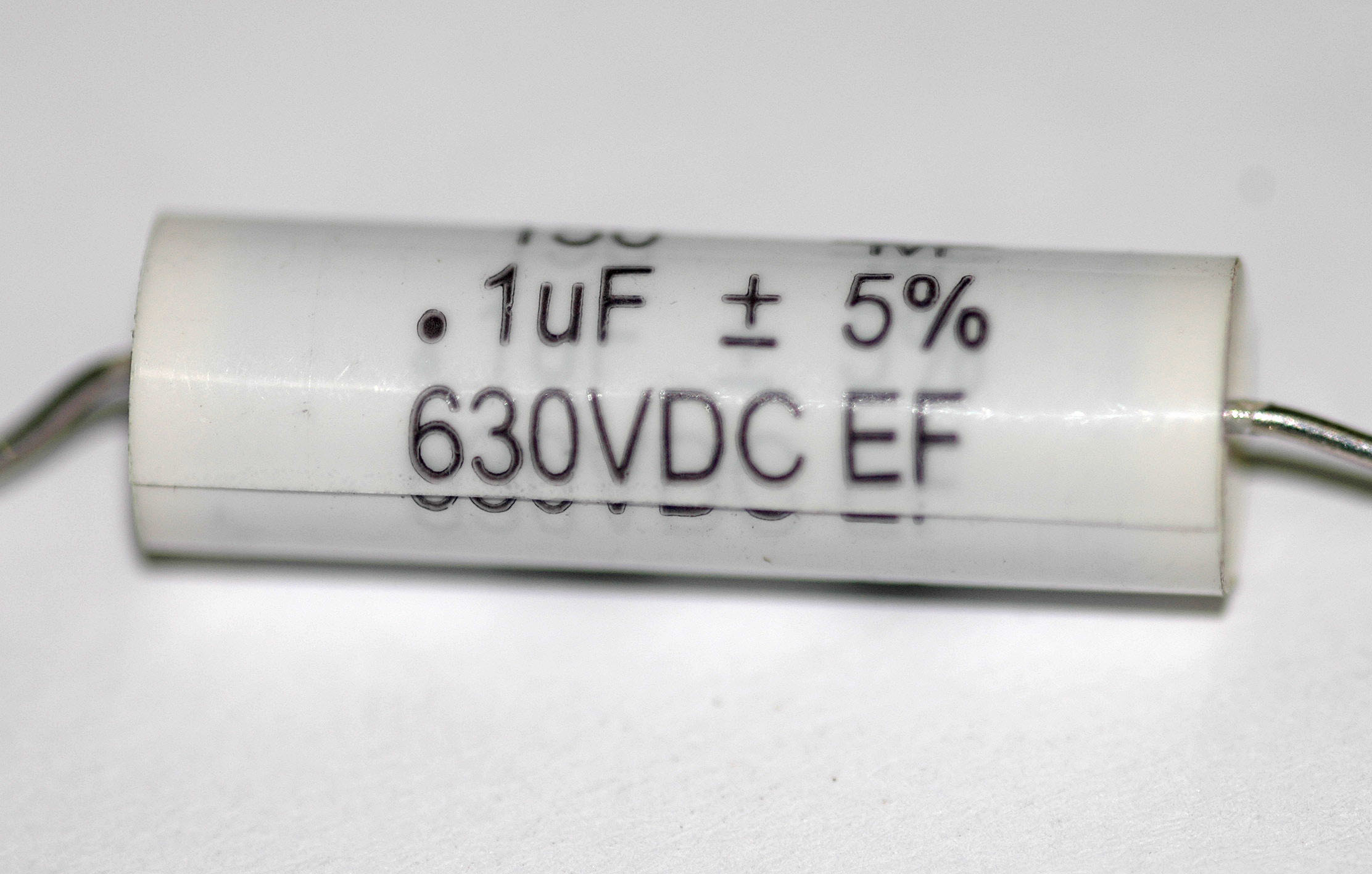
Axial style for point-to-point and through-hole mounting

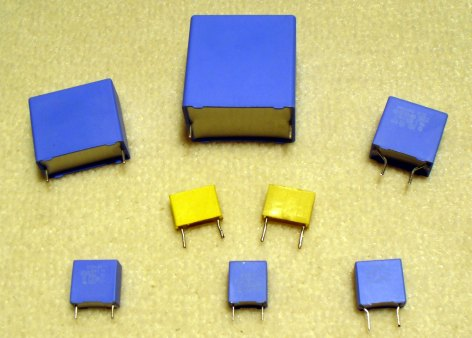
Radial style (single ended) for through-hole solder mounting on printed circuit boards

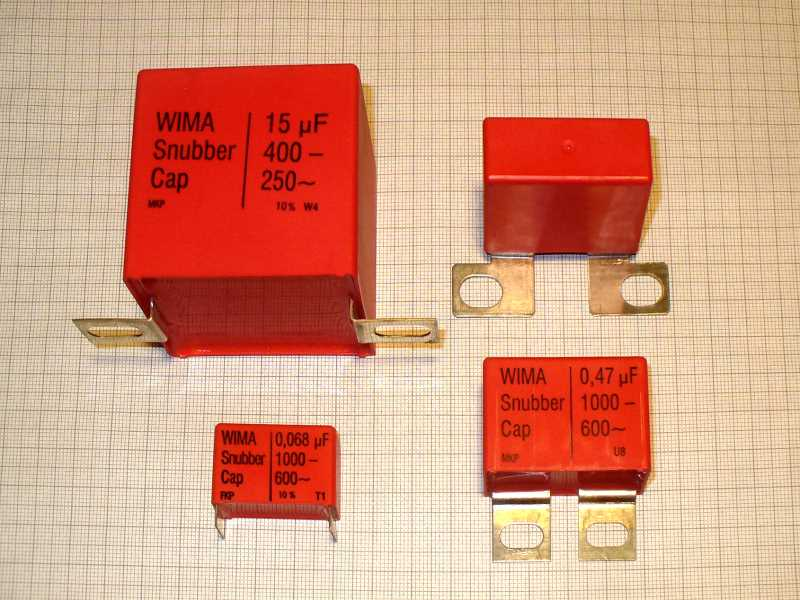
Radial style with heavy-duty solder terminals for snubber applications and high surge pulse loads

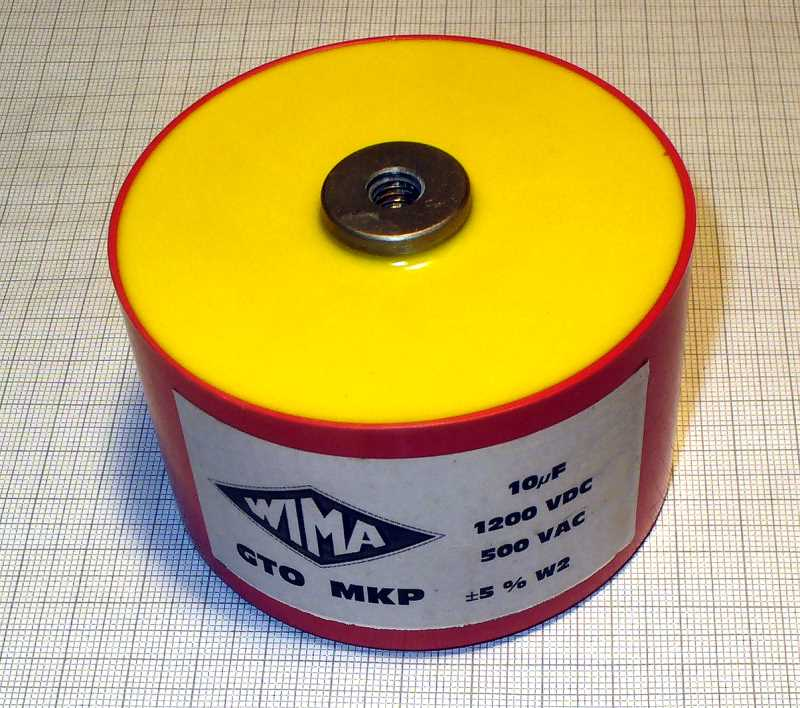
Heavy-duty snubber capacitor with screw terminals

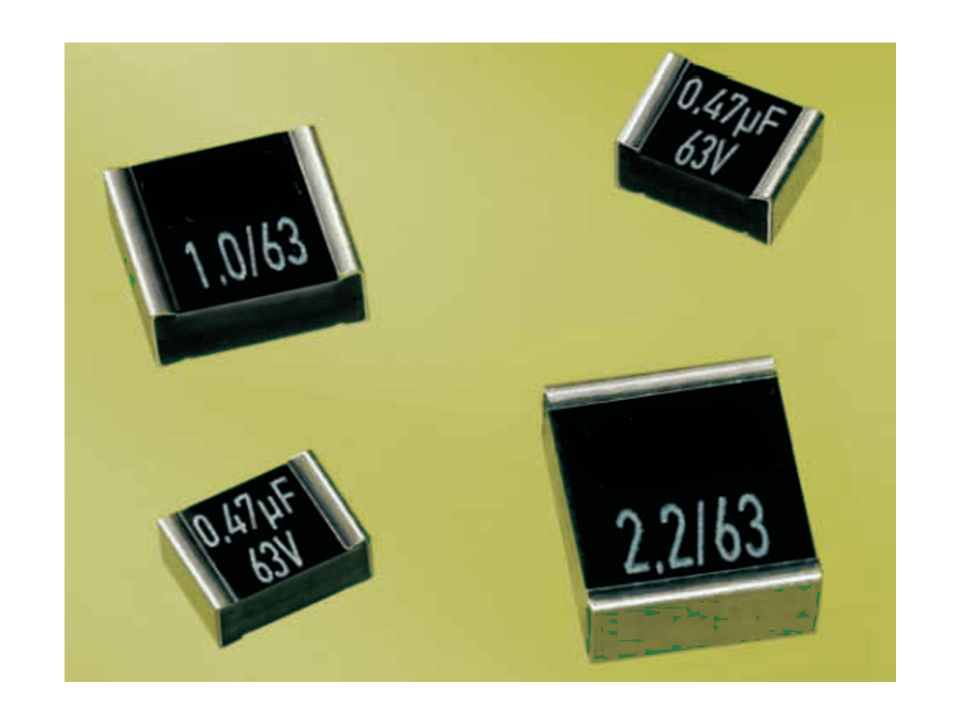
SMD style for printed circuit board surface mounting, with metallized contacts on two opposite edges

Film capacitors for use in electronic equipment are packaged in the common and usual industry styles: axial, radial, and SMD. Traditional axial type packages are less used today, but are still specified for point-to-point wiring and some traditional through-hole printed circuit boards. The most common form factor is the radial type (single ended), with both terminals on one side of the capacitor body. To facilitate automated insertion, radial plastic film capacitors are commonly constructed with terminal spacings at standardized distances, starting with 2.5 mm pitch and increasing in 2.5 mm steps. Radial capacitors are available potted in plastic cases, or dipped in an epoxy resin to protect the capacitor body against environmental influences. Although the transient heat of reflow soldering induces high stress in the plastic film materials, film capacitors able to withstand such temperatures are available in surface-mounted device (SMD) packages.

== Historical development ==
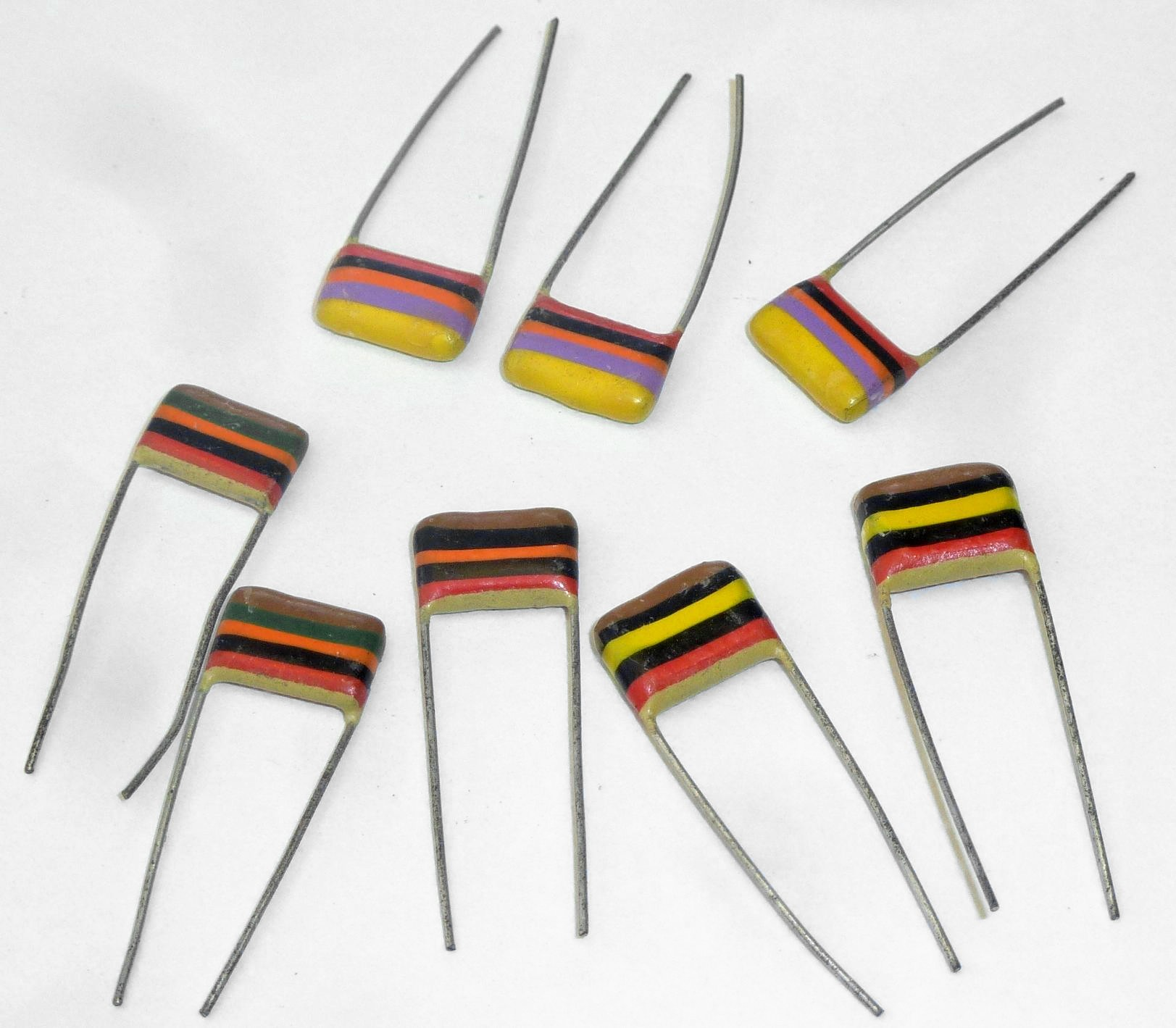
Mullard (and Philips) C280 polyester capacitors, with striped color codes, popular during 1960s/1970s

Before the introduction of plastic films, capacitors made by sandwiching a strip of wax-impregnated paper between strips of metal, and rolling the result into a cylinder–paper capacitors–were commonly used; their manufacture started in 1876, and they were used from the early 20th century as decoupling capacitors in telecommunications (telephony).

With the development of plastic materials by organic chemists during the Second World War, the capacitor industry began to replace paper with thinner polymer films. One very early development in film capacitors was described in British Patent 587,953 in 1944. The introduction of plastics in plastic film capacitors was approximately in the following historic order: polystyrene (PS) in 1949, polyethylene terephthalate (PET/"polyester") and cellulose acetate (CA) in 1951, polycarbonate (PC/Lexan) in 1953, polytetrafluoroethylene (PTFE/Teflon) in 1954, polyparylene in 1954, polypropylene (PP) in 1954, polyethylene (PE) in 1958, and polyphenylene sulphide (PPS) in 1967. By the mid-1960s there was a wide range of different plastic film capacitors offered by many, mostly European and US manufacturers. German manufacturers such as WIMA, Roederstein, Siemens and Philips were trend-setters and leaders in a world market driven by consumer electronics.

One of the great advantages of plastic films for capacitor fabrication is that plastic films have considerably fewer defects than paper sheets used in paper capacitors. This allows the manufacture of plastic film capacitors with only a single layer of plastic film, whereas paper capacitors need a double layer of paper. Plastic film capacitors were significantly smaller in physical size (better volumetric efficiency), with the same capacitance value and the same dielectric strength as comparable paper capacitors. Then-new plastic materials also showed further advantages compared with paper. Plastic is much less hygroscopic than paper, reducing the deleterious effects of imperfect sealing. Additionally, most plastics are subject to fewer chemical changes over long periods, providing long-term stability of their electrical parameters. Since around 1980, paper and metallized paper capacitors (MP capacitors) have almost completely been replaced by PET film capacitors for most low-power DC electronic applications. Paper is now used only in RFI suppression or motor run capacitors, or as a mixed dielectric combined with polypropylene films in large AC and DC capacitors for high-power applications.

An early special type of plastic film capacitors were the cellulose acetate film capacitors, also called MKU capacitors. The polar insulating dielectric cellulose acetate was a synthetic resin that could be made for metallized capacitors in paint film thickness down to about 3 μm. A liquid layer of cellulose acetate was first applied to a paper carrier, then covered with wax, dried and then metallized. During winding of the capacitor body, the paper was removed from the metallized film. The remaining thin cellulose acetate layer had a dielectric breakdown of 63 V, enough for many of general purpose applications. The very small thickness of the dielectric decreased the overall dimensions of these capacitors compared to other film capacitors of the time. MKU film capacitors are no longer manufactured, because polyester film capacitors can now be produced in the smaller sizes that were the market niche of the MKU type.

Film capacitors have become much smaller since the beginning of the technology. Through development of thinner plastic films, for example, the dimensions of metallized polyester film capacitors were decreased by a factor of approximately 3 to 4.

The most important advantages of film capacitors are the stability of their electrical values over long durations, their reliability, and lower cost than some other types for the same applications. Especially for applications with high current pulse loads or high AC loads in electrical systems, heavy-duty film capacitors, here called "power capacitors", are available with dielectric ratings of several kilovolts.

But the manufacture of film capacitors does have a critical dependency on the materials supply chain. Each of the plastic film materials used for film capacitors worldwide is produced by only two or three large suppliers. The reason for this is that the mass quantities required by the market for film caps are quite small compared to typical chemical company production runs. This leads to a great dependency of the capacitor manufacturers on relatively few chemical companies as raw material suppliers. For example, in the year 2000 Bayer AG stopped their production of polycarbonate films, due to unprofitably low sales volumes. Most of the producers of polycarbonate film capacitors had to quickly change their product offerings to another type of capacitor, and a lot of expensive testing approvals for new designs were required.

As of 2012, only five plastic materials continued to be widely used in the capacitor industry as films for capacitors: PET, PEN, PP, PPS and PTFE. Other plastic materials are no longer in common use, either because they are no longer manufactured, or they have been replaced with better materials. Even the long-time manufactured polystyrene (PS) and polycarbonate (PC) film capacitors have been largely replaced by the previously mentioned film types, though at least one PC capacitor manufacturer retains the ability to make its own films from raw polycarbonate feedstock. The less-common plastic films are described briefly here, since they are still encountered in older designs, and are still available from some suppliers.

From simple beginnings film capacitors developed into a very broad and highly specialized range of different types. By the end of the 20th century mass production of most film capacitors had shifted to the Far East. A few large companies still produce highly specialized film capacitors in Europe and in the US, for power and AC applications.

== Dielectric materials and their market share ==
The following table identifies the most commonly used dielectric polymers for film capacitors.

Dielectric: general names, chemical names, abbreviations, and trade names
Dielectric	Abbreviation	Trade name
Polypropylene	PP	Tervakoski Film, Treofan
Polyester, Polyethylene terephthalate	PET	Hostaphan, Mylar
Polyethylene naphthalate	PEN	Kaladex
Polyphenylene sulfide	PPS	Torelina
Polytetrafluoroethylene	PTFE	Teflon
Polystyrene	PS	Styroflex
Polycarbonate	PC	Makrofol

Also, different film materials can be mixed to produce capacitors with particular properties.

The most used film materials are polypropylene, with a market share of 50%, followed by polyester, with a 40% share. The remaining 10% share is accounted for by the other dielectric materials, including polyphenylene sulfide and paper, with roughly 3% each.

Polycarbonate film capacitors are no longer manufactured because the dielectric material is no longer available.

== Characteristics of film materials for film capacitors ==
The electrical characteristics, and the temperature and frequency behavior of film capacitors are essentially determined by the type of material that forms the dielectric of the capacitor. The following table lists the most important characteristics of the principal plastic film materials in use today. Characteristics of mixed film materials are not listed here.

The figures in this table are extracted from specifications published by various different manufacturers of film capacitors for industrial electronic applications.

The large range of values for the dissipation factor includes both typical and maximum specifications from data sheets of the various manufacturers. Typical electrical values for power and large AC capacitors were not included in this table.

Characteristics of plastic film materials for film capacitors
		Film material, abbreviated codes			
Film characteristics		PET	PEN	PPS	PP
Relative permittivity at 1 kHz		3.3	3.0	3.0	2.2
Minimum film thickness (μm)		0.7...0.9	0.9...1.4	1.2	1.9...3.0
Moisture absorption (%)		low	0.4	0.05	<0.1
Dielectric strength (V/μm)		~580	~500	~470	~650
Commercial realized voltage proof (V/μm)		280	300	220	400
DC voltage range (V)		50—1000	16—250	16—100	40—2000
Capacitance range		100 pF—22 μF	100 pF—1 μF	100 pF—0.47 μF	100 pF—10 μF
Application temperature range (°C)		-55 — +125 /+150	-55 — +150	-55 — +150	-55 — +105
ΔC/C versus temperature range (%)		±5	±5	±1.5	±2.5
Dissipation factor (•10^{−4})
Dissipation factor (•10^{−4})	at 1 kHz	50—200	42—80	2—15	0.5—5
Dissipation factor (•10^{−4})	at 10 kHz	110—150	54—150	2.5—25	2—8
Dissipation factor (•10^{−4})	at 100 kHz	170—300	120—300	12—60	2—25
Dissipation factor (•10^{−4})	at 1 MHz	200—350	–	18—70	4—40
Time constant R_{Iso}•C (s)	at 25 °C	≥10000	≥10000	≥10000	≥100000
Time constant R_{Iso}•C (s)	at 85 °C	1.000	1.000	1.000	10.000
Dielectric absorption ( %)		0.2—0.5	1—1.2	0.05—0.1	0.01—0.1
Specific capacitance (nF•V/mm^{3})		400	250	140	50

=== Polypropylene (PP) film capacitors ===
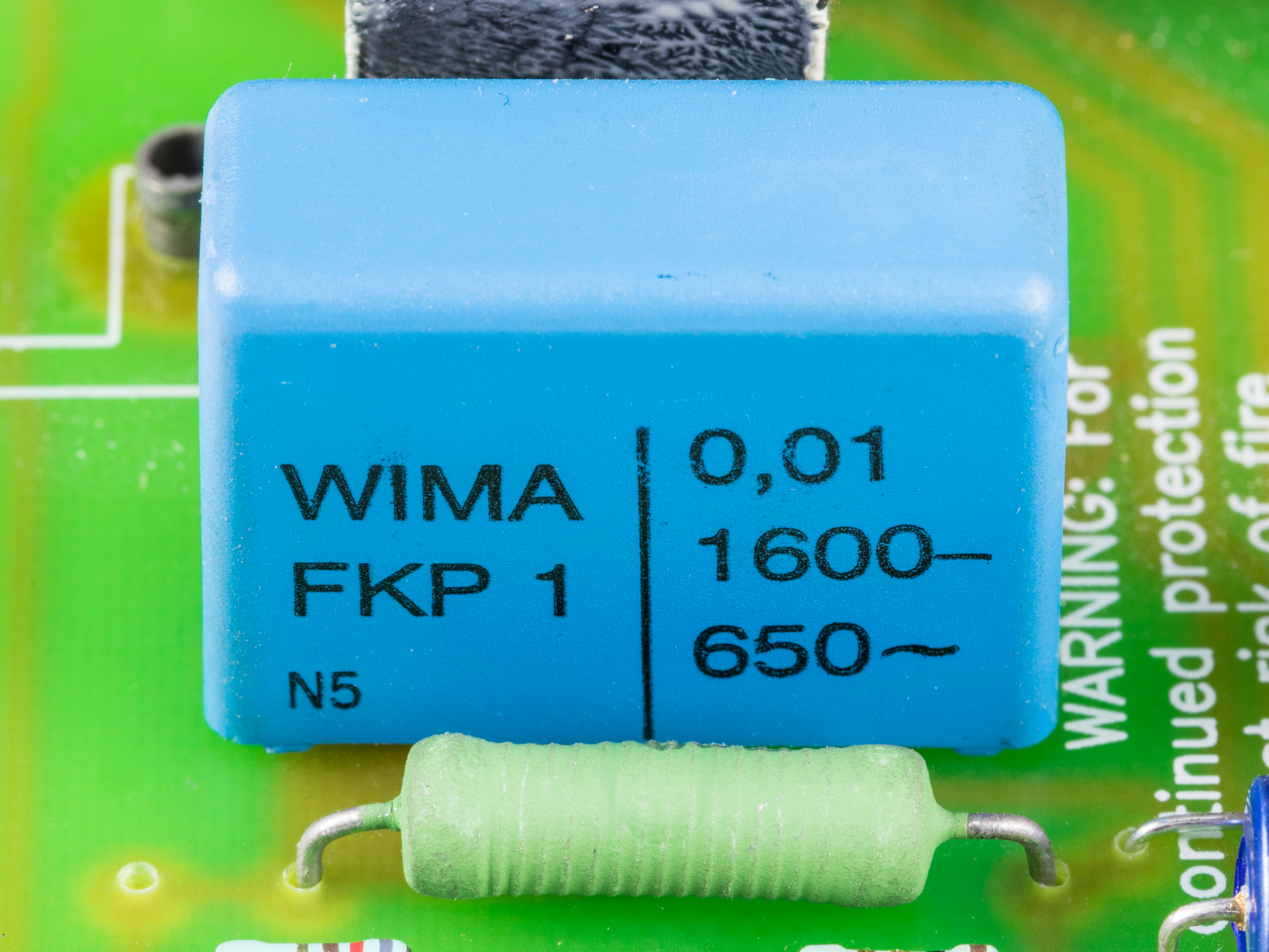
FKP 1 polypropylene (PP) capacitor for pulse applications with metal foil manufactured by WIMA

Polypropylene film capacitors have a dielectric made of the thermoplastic, non-polar, organic and partially crystalline polymer material Polypropylene (PP), trade name Treofan, from the family of polyolefins. They are manufactured both as metallized wound and stacked versions, as well as film/foil types. Polypropylene film is the most-used dielectric film in industrial capacitors and also in power capacitor types. The polypropylene film material absorbs less moisture than polyester film and is therefore also suitable for "naked" designs without any coating or further packaging. But the maximum temperature of 105 °C hinders use of PP films in SMD packaging.

The temperature and frequency dependencies of electrical parameters for polypropylene film capacitors are very low. Polypropylene film capacitors have a linear, negative temperature coefficient of capacitance of ±2,5 % within their temperature range. Therefore, polypropylene film capacitors are suitable for applications in Class 1 frequency-determining circuits, filters, oscillator circuits, audio circuits, and timers. They are also useful for compensation of inductive coils in precision filter applications, and for high-frequency applications.

In addition to the application class qualification for the film/foil version of PP film capacitors, the standard IEC/EN 60384-13 specifies three "stability classes". These stability classes specify the tolerance on temperature coefficients together with the permissible change of capacitance after defined tests. They are divided into different temperature coefficient grades (α) with associated tolerances and preferred values of permissible change of capacitance after mechanical, ambient (moisture) and life time tests.

Stability classes of polypropylene film/foil capacitors referring to IEC/EN 60384-13
Stability class	Temperature coefficient (α) and tolerance in parts per million per kelvin 10^{−6}/K					Permissible change of capacitance Upper category temperature	
	-80	-100	-125	-160	-250	85 °C	100 °C
1	±40	±50	±60	±80	±120	±(0.5 %+0.5 pF)	±(1 %+0.5 pF)
2	-	±100	±125	±160	±250	±(1 %+1 pF)	±(1 %+1 pF)
3	-	-	-	±160	±250	±(2 %+2 pF)	±(5 %+2 pF)

The table is not valid for capacitance values smaller than 50 pF.

In addition, PP film capacitors have the lowest dielectric absorption, which makes them suitable for applications such as VCO timing capacitors, sample-and-hold applications, and audio circuits. They are available for these precision applications in very narrow capacitance tolerances.

The dissipation factor of PP film capacitors is smaller than that of other film capacitors. Due to the low and very stable dissipation factor over a wide temperature and frequency range, even at very high frequencies, and their high dielectric strength of 650 V/μm, PP film capacitors can be used in metallized and in film/foil versions as capacitors for pulse applications, such as CRT-scan deflection circuits, or as so-called "snubber" capacitors, or in IGBT applications. In addition, polypropylene film capacitors are used in AC power applications, such as motor run capacitors or power-factor correction (PFC) capacitors.

Polypropylene film capacitors are widely used for EMI suppression, including direct connection to the power supply mains. In this latter application, they must meet special testing and certification requirements concerning safety and non-flammability.

Most power capacitors, the largest capacitors made, generally use polypropylene film as the dielectric. PP film capacitors are used for high-frequency high-power applications such as induction heating, for pulsed power energy discharge applications, and as AC capacitors for electrical distribution. The AC voltage ratings of these capacitors can range up to 400 kV.

The relatively low permittivity of 2.2 is a slight disadvantage, and PP film capacitors tend to be somewhat physically larger than other film caps.

The capacitor grade films are produced up to 20 μm in thickness with width of roll up to 140 mm. Rolls are carefully vacuum packed in pairs according to the specifications required for the capacitor.

=== Polyester (PET) film capacitors ===
Polyester film capacitors are film capacitors using a dielectric made of the thermoplastic polar polymer material polyethylene terephthalate (PET), trade names Hostaphan or Mylar, from the polyester family. They are manufactured both as metallized wound and stacked versions, as well as film/foil types. The polyester film adsorbs very little moisture, and this feature makes it suitable for "naked" designs without any further coating needed. They are the low-cost mass-produced capacitors in modern electronics, featuring relatively small dimensions with relatively high capacitance values. PET capacitors are mainly used as general purpose capacitors for DC applications, or for semi-critical circuits with operating temperatures up to 125 °C. The maximum temperature rating of 125 °C also allows SMD film capacitors to be made with PET films. The low cost of polyester and the relatively compact dimensions are the main reasons for the high prevalence of PET film capacitors in modern designs.

The small physical dimensions of PET film capacitors are the result of a high relative permittivity of 3.3, combined with a relatively high dielectric strength leads to a relatively high volumetric efficiency. This advantage of compactness comes with some disadvantages. The capacitance temperature dependence of polyester film capacitors is relatively high compared to other film capacitors, ±5% over the entire temperature range. The capacitance frequency dependence of polyester film capacitors compared with the other film capacitors is -3% in the range from 100 Hz to 100 kHz at the upper limit. Also, the temperature and frequency dependence of the dissipation factor are higher for polyester film capacitors compared with the other film capacitor types.

Polyester film capacitors are mainly used for general purpose applications or semi-critical circuits with operating temperatures up to 125 °C.

=== Polyethylene naphthalate (PEN) film capacitors ===
Polyethylene naphthalate film capacitors are film capacitors using a dielectric made of the thermoplastic biaxial polymer material polyethylene naphthalate (PEN), trade names Kaladex, Teonex. They are produced only as metallized types. PEN, like PET, belongs to the polyester family, but has better stability at high temperatures. Therefore, PEN film capacitors are more suitable for high temperature applications and for SMD packaging.

The temperature and frequency dependence of the electrical characteristics for capacitance and dissipation factor of PEN film capacitors are similar to the PET film capacitors. Because of the smaller relative permittivity and lower dielectric strength of the PEN polymer, PEN film capacitors are physically larger for a given capacitance and rated voltage value. In spite of this, PEN film capacitors are preferred over PET when the ambient temperature during operation of the capacitors is permanently above 125 °C. The special PEN "high voltage" (HV) dielectric offers excellent electrical properties during the life tests at high voltages and high temperatures (175 °C). PEN capacitors are mainly used for non-critical filtering, coupling and decoupling in electronic circuits, when the temperature dependencies do not matter.

=== Polyphenylene sulfide (PPS) film capacitors ===
Polyphenylene sulfide film capacitors are film capacitors with dielectric made of the thermoplastic, organic, and partially crystalline polymer material Poly(p-phenylene sulfide) (PPS), trade name Torelina. They are only produced as metallized types.

The temperature dependence of the capacitance of PPS film capacitors over the entire temperature range is very small (± 1.5%) compared with other film capacitors. Also the frequency dependence in the range from 100 Hz to 100 kHz of the capacitance of the PPS film capacitors is ± 0.5%, very low compared with other film capacitors. The dissipation factor of PPS film capacitors is quite small, and the temperature and frequency dependence of the dissipation factor over a wide range is very stable. Only at temperatures above 100 °C does the dissipation factor increase to larger values. The dielectric absorption performance is excellent, behind only PTFE and PS dielectric capacitors.

Polyphenylene sulfide film capacitors are well-suited for applications in frequency-determining circuits and for high-temperature applications. Because of their good electrical properties, PPS film capacitors are an ideal replacement for polycarbonate film capacitors, whose production since 2000 has been largely discontinued.

In addition to their excellent electrical properties, PPS film capacitors can withstand temperatures up to 270 °C without damaging the film quality, so that PPS film capacitors are suitable for surface mount devices (SMD), and can tolerate the increased reflow soldering temperatures for lead-free soldering mandated by the RoHS 2002/95/EC directive.

Cost of a PPS film capacitor is usually higher compared to a PP film capacitor.

=== Polytetrafluoroethylene (PTFE) film capacitors ===
Polytetrafluoroethylene film capacitors are made with a dielectric of the synthetic fluoropolymer polytetrafluoroethylene (PTFE), a hydrophobic solid fluorocarbon. They are manufactured both as metallized and as film/foil types, although poor adherence to the film makes metallization difficult. PTFE is often known by the DuPont trademark Teflon.

Polytetrafluoroethylene film capacitors feature a very high temperature resistance up to 200 °C, and even further up to 260 °C, with a voltage derating. The dissipation factor 2 • 10 ^{−4} is quite small. The change in capacitance over the entire temperature range of +1% to -3% is a little bit higher than for polypropylene film capacitors. However, since the smallest available film thickness for PTFE films is 5.5 μm, approximately twice of the thickness of polypropylene films, the PTFE film capacitors are physically bulkier than PP film capacitors. It added that the film thickness on the surface is not constant, so that Teflon films are difficult to produce. Therefore, the number of manufacturers of PTFE film capacitors is limited.

PTFE film capacitors are available with rated voltages of 100 V to 630 V DC. They are used in military equipment, in aerospace, in geological probes, in burn-in circuits and in high-quality audio circuits. Main producers of PTFE film capacitors are located in the USA.

=== Polystyrene (PS) film capacitors ===
Polystyrene film capacitors, sometimes known as "Styroflex Capacitors", were well known for many years as inexpensive film capacitors for general purpose applications, in which high capacitance stability, low dissipation factor and low leakage currents were needed. But because the film thickness could be not made thinner than 10 μm, and the maximum temperature ratings reached only 85 °C, the PS film capacitors have mostly been replaced by polyester film capacitors as of 2012. However, some manufacturers may still offer PS film capacitors in their production program, backed by large amounts of polystyrene film stocked in their warehouse. Polystyrene capacitors have an important advantage - they have a temperature coefficient near zero and so are useful in tuned circuits where drift with temperature must be avoided.

=== Polycarbonate (PC) film capacitors ===
Polycarbonate film capacitors are film capacitors with a dielectric made of the polymerized esters of carbonic acid and dihydric alcohols polycarbonate (PC), sometimes given the trademarked name Makrofol. They are manufactured as wound metallized as well as film/foil types.

These capacitors have a low dissipation factor and because of their relatively temperature-independent electrical properties of about ±80 ppm over the entire temperature range, they had many applications for low-loss and temperature-stable applications such as timing circuits, precision analog circuits, and signal filters in applications with tough environmental conditions. PC film capacitors had been manufactured since the mid-1950s, but the main supplier of polycarbonate film for capacitors had ceased the production of this polymer in film form as of the year 2000. As a result, most of the manufacturers of polycarbonate film capacitors worldwide had to stop their production of PC film capacitors and changed to polypropylene film capacitors instead.

=== Paper (film) capacitors (MP) and mixed film capacitors ===
Power film capacitors using metallized paper as carrier of the electrodes, their different configurations and their usual abbreviated designations

MP capacitor, single-sided metallized paper (additional layer of paper to cover pinhole defects), windings impregnated with insulating oil

MKP power capacitor, single-sided metallized paper and polypropylene film, (mixed dielectric), windings impregnated with insulating oil

MKV power capacitor, double-sided metallized paper (field-free mechanical carrier of the electrodes), polypropylene film (dielectric), windings impregnated with insulating oil

Historically, the first "film" type capacitors were paper capacitors of film/foil configuration. They were fairly bulky, and not particularly reliable. As of 2012, paper is used in the form of metallized paper for MP capacitors with self-healing properties used for EMI suppression. Paper is also used as an insulating mechanical carrier of metallized-layer electrodes, and combined with polypropylene dielectric, mostly in power capacitors rated for high current AC and high voltage DC applications.

Paper as a carrier of the electrodes has the advantages of lower cost and better adherence of metallization than polymer films. However paper alone as a dielectric in capacitors is not reliable enough for the quality requirements of modern applications. The combination of paper together with a polypropylene film dielectric is a cost-effective way to improve quality and performance. The better adhering of metallization on paper is advantageous especially at high current pulse loads, and the polypropylene film dielectric increases the voltage rating.

However, the roughness of a metallized paper surface can cause many small air-filled bubbles between the dielectric and the metallization, decreasing the breakdown voltage of the capacitor. For this reason, larger film capacitors or power capacitors using paper as carrier of the electrodes usually are filled with an insulating oil or gas, to displace the air bubbles for a higher breakdown voltage.

However, since almost every major manufacturer offers its own proprietary film capacitors with mixed film materials, it is difficult to give a universal and general overview of the specific properties of mixed film capacitors.

=== Other plastic film capacitors ===
Other plastic materials than those described above may be used as the dielectric in film capacitors. Thermoplastic polymers such as Polyimide (PI), Polyamide (PA, better known as Nylon or Perlon), Polyvinylidene fluoride (PVDF), Siloxane, Polysulfone (PEx) and Aromatic Polyester (FPE) are described in the technical literature as possible dielectric films for capacitors. The primary reason for considering new film materials for capacitors is the relative low permittivity of commonly used materials. With a higher permittivity, film capacitors could be made even smaller, an advantage in the market for more-compact portable electronic devices.

In 1984, a new film capacitor technology that makes use of vacuum-deposited electron-beam cross-linked acrylate materials as dielectric in film capacitors was announced as a patent in the press. But as of 2012, only one manufacturer markets a specific acrylate SMD film capacitor, as an X7R MLCC replacement.

Polyimide (PI), a thermoplastic polymer of imide monomers, is proposed for film capacitors called Polyimide-, PI- or Kapton capacitors. Kapton is the trade name of polyimide from DuPont. This material is of interest because its high temperature resistance up to 400 °C. But as of 2012, no specific PI capacitor series film capacitors have been announced. The offered film capacitor, Kapton CapacitorCL11, announced from "dhgate" is a "Type: Polypropylene Film Capacitor". Another very strange Kapton capacitor can be found at YEC, a Chinese producer of capacitors. Here the announced "Kapton capacitors" are in reality supercapacitors, a completely different technology. Perhaps the Kapton film in these supercapacitors is used as a separator between the electrodes of this double-layer capacitor. Kapton films are often offered as an adhesive film for the outer insulation of capacitor packages.

Polyvinylidene fluoride (PVDF) has a very high permittivity of 18 to 20, which allows large amounts of energy to be stored in a small space (volumetric efficiency). However, it has a Curie temperature of only 60 °C, which limits its usability. Film capacitors with PVDF are described for one very special application, in portable defibrillators.

As of 2012, for all the other mentioned materials such as PA, PVDF, Siloxane, PEx or FPE, specific series of film capacitors with these plastic films are not known to be produced in commercial quantities.

== Standardization of film capacitors ==
The standardization for all electrical, electronic components and related technologies follows the rules given by the International Electrotechnical Commission (IEC), a non-profit, non-governmental international standards organization. The IEC standards are harmonized with European standards EN.

The definition of the characteristics and the procedure of the test methods for capacitors for use in electronic equipment are set out in the generic specification:

- IEC/EN 60384–1, Fixed capacitors for use in electronic equipment - Part 1: Generic specification

The tests and requirements to be met by film capacitors for use in electronic equipment for approval as standardized types are set out in the following sectional specifications:

Overview of standards for film capacitors
Standard number	Film short name	Capacitor construction	Terminals	Voltage	Standard description
IEC/EN 60384-2	PET	metallized	leaded	DC	Fixed metallized polyethylene-terephthalate film dielectric d.c. capacitors
IEC/EN 60384-11	PET	film/foil	leaded	DC	Fixed polyethylene-terephthalate film dielectric metal foil d.c. capacitors
IEC/EN 60384-13	PP	film/foil	leaded	DC	Fixed polypropylene film dielectric metal foil d.c. capacitors
IEC/EN 60384-16	PP	metallized	leaded	DC	Fixed metallized polypropylene film dielectric d.c. capacitors
IEC/EN 60384-17	PP	metallized	leaded	AC	Fixed metallized polypropylene film dielectric a.c. and pulse
IEC/EN 60384-19	PET	metallized	SMD	DC	Fixed metallized polyethylene-terephthalate film dielectric surface mount d.c. capacitors
IEC/EN 60384-20	PPS	metallized	SMD	DC	Fixed metallized polyphenylene sulfide film dielectric surface mount d.c. capacitors
IEC/EN 60384-23	PEN	metallized	SMD	DC	Fixed metallized polyethylene naphthalate film dielectric chip d.c. capacitors

The standardization of power capacitors is strongly focused on rules for the safety of personnel and equipment, given by the local regulating authority. The concepts and definitions to guarantee safe application of power capacitors are published in the following standards:

- IEC/EN 61071; Capacitors for power electronics
- IEC/EN 60252-1; AC motor capacitors. General. Performance, testing and rating. Safety requirements. Guidance for installation and operation
- IEC/EN 60110-1; Power capacitors for induction heating installations - General
- IEC/EN 60567; Oil-filled electrical equipment - Sampling of gases and of oil for analysis of free and dissolved gases – Guidance
- IEC/EN 60143-1; Series capacitors for power systems. General
- IEC/EN 60143-2; Series capacitors for power systems. Protective equipment for series capacitor banks
- IEC/EN 60143–3; Series capacitors for power systems - Internal fuses
- IEC/EN 60252-2; AC motor capacitors. Motor start capacitors
- IEC/EN 60831-1; Shunt power capacitors of the self-healing type for a.c. systems having a rated voltage up to and including 1kV. General. Performance, testing and rating. Safety requirements. Guide for installation and operation
- IEC/EN 60831-2; Shunt power capacitors of the self-healing type for a.c. systems having a rated voltage up to and including 1000 V. Ageing test, self-healing test and destruction test
- IEC/EN 60871-1; Shunt capacitors for a.c. power systems having a rated voltage above 1000 V. General
- IEC/EN 60931-1; Shunt power capacitors of the non-self-healing type for a.c. systems having a rated voltage up to and including 1 kV - General - Performance, testing and rating - Safety requirements - Guide for installation and operation
- IEC/EN 60931-2; Shunt power capacitors of the non-self-healing type for a.c. systems having a rated voltage up to and including 1000 V. Ageing test and destruction test
- IEC 60143-4; Series capacitors for power systems. Thyristor controlled series capacitors
- IEC/EN 61921; Power capacitors. Low-voltage power factor correction banks
- IEC/EN 60931-3; Shunt power capacitors of the non-self-healing type for a.c. systems having a rated voltage up to and including 1000 V. Internal fuses
- IEC/EN 61881-1; Railway applications. Rolling stock equipment. Capacitors for power electronics. Paper/plastic film capacitors
- IEC 62146-1; Grading capacitors for high-voltage alternating current circuit-breakers

The text above is directly extracted from the relevant IEC standards, which use the abbreviations "d.c." for Direct Current (DC) and "a.c." for Alternating Current (AC).

=== Film capacitors type abbreviations ===
During the early development of film capacitors, some large manufacturers have tried to standardize the names of different film materials. This resulted in a former German standard (DIN 41 379), since withdrawn, in which an abbreviated code for each material and configuration type were prescribed. Many manufacturers continue to use these de facto standard abbreviations.

However, with the relocation of mass-market business in the passive components industry, which includes film capacitors, many of the new manufacturers in the Far East use their own abbreviations that differ from the previously established abbreviations.

Common abbreviations for film capacitor types
Dielectric material	Chemical abbreviation	Film capacitor (Kondensator) type abbreviation	
Dielectric material	Chemical abbreviation	Film/foil construction	Metallized construction
Paper	(P)	–	(MP)
Polyethylene terephthalate, Polyester	PET	(F)KT	MKT; MKS
Polyethylene naphthalate	PEN	(F)KN	MKN
Polyphenylene sulfide	PPS	(F)KI	MKI
Polypropylene	PP	(F)KP	MKP
Polytetrafluoroethylene	PTFE	–	–
Polystyrene	PS	KS	
Polycarbonate	PC	(F)KC	MKC

== Electrical characteristics ==
The manufacturers Wima, Vishay and TDK Epcos specify the electrical parameters of their film capacitors in a general technical information sheet.

=== Series-equivalent circuit ===
Series-equivalent circuit model of a film capacitor

The electrical characteristics of capacitors are harmonized by the international generic specification IEC/EN 60384–1. In this standard, the electrical characteristics of capacitors are described by an idealized series-equivalent circuit with electrical components which model all ohmic losses, capacitive and inductive parameters of a film capacitor:

- C, the capacitance of the capacitor,
- R_{isol}, the insulation resistance of the dielectric,
- R_{ESR}, the equivalent series resistance which summarizes all ohmic losses of the capacitor, usually abbreviated as "ESR".
- L_{ESL}, the equivalent series inductance which is the effective self-inductance of the capacitor, usually abbreviated as "ESL".

The two reactive resistances have following relations with the angular frequency "ω":

- Capacitance (Capacitive reactance) : $X_C= -\frac{1}{\omega C}$
- Inductance(Inductive reactance): $X_L=\omega L_{\mathrm{ESL}}$

=== Capacitance standard values and tolerances ===
The rated capacitance is the value for which the capacitor has been designed. The actual capacitance of film capacitors depends on the measuring frequency and the ambient temperature. Standardized conditions for film capacitors are a measuring frequency of 1 kHz and a temperature of 20 °C. The percentage of allowed deviation of the capacitance from the rated value is called capacitance tolerance. The actual capacitance value of a capacitor should be within the tolerance limits, or the capacitor is out of specification.

Film capacitors are available in different tolerance series, whose values are specified in the E series standards specified in IEC/EN 60063. For abbreviated marking in tight spaces, a letter code for each tolerance is specified in IEC/EN 60062.

- rated capacitance, E96 series, tolerance ±1%, letter code "F"
- rated capacitance, E48 series, tolerance ±2%, letter code "G"
- rated capacitance, E24 series, tolerance ±5%, letter code "J"
- rated capacitance, E12 series, tolerance ±10%, letter code "K"
- rated capacitance, E6 series, tolerance ±20%, letter code "M"

The required capacitance tolerance is determined by the particular application. The narrow tolerances of E24 to E96 will be used for high-quality circuits like precision oscillators and timers. On the other hand, for general applications such as non-critical filtering or coupling circuits, the tolerance series E12 or E6 are sufficient.

==== Frequency and temperature changes in capacitance ====
The different film materials have temperature- and frequency-dependent differences in their characteristics. The graphs below show typical temperature and frequency behavior of the capacitance for different film materials.

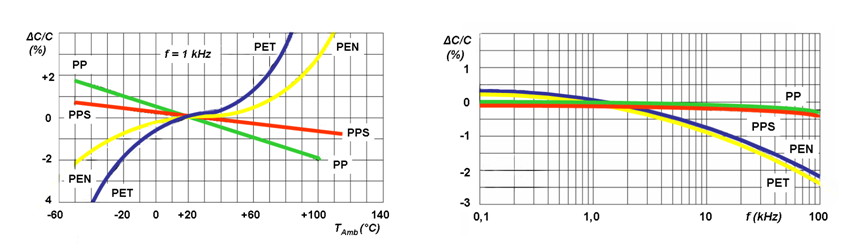
Capacitance as a function of temperature and frequency, for film capacitors with different film materials

=== Voltage ratings ===
==== DC voltage ====
Voltage derating between upper rated temperature (85 °C for PP, PET and 105 °C for PEN, PPS), and upper category temperature

The rated DC voltage V_{R} is the maximum DC voltage, or peak value of pulse voltage, or the sum of an applied DC voltage and the peak value of a superimposed AC voltage, which may be applied continuously to a capacitor at any temperature between the category temperature and the rated temperature.

The breakdown voltage of film capacitors decreases with increasing temperature. When using film capacitors at temperatures between the upper rated temperature and the upper category temperature, only a temperature-derated category voltage V_{C} is allowed. The derating factors apply to both DC and AC voltages. Some manufacturers may have quite different derating curves for their capacitors compared with the generic curves given in the picture at the right.

The allowable peak value of a superimposed alternating voltage, called the "rated ripple voltage", is frequency-dependent. The applicable standards specify the following conditions, regardless of the type of dielectric film.

Frequency of superimposed AC voltage	Percentages of the superimposed peak AC voltage compared to the rated voltage at the frequencies stated
50 Hz	20%
100 Hz	15%
1 kHz	3%
10 kHz	1%

==== AC voltage and current ====
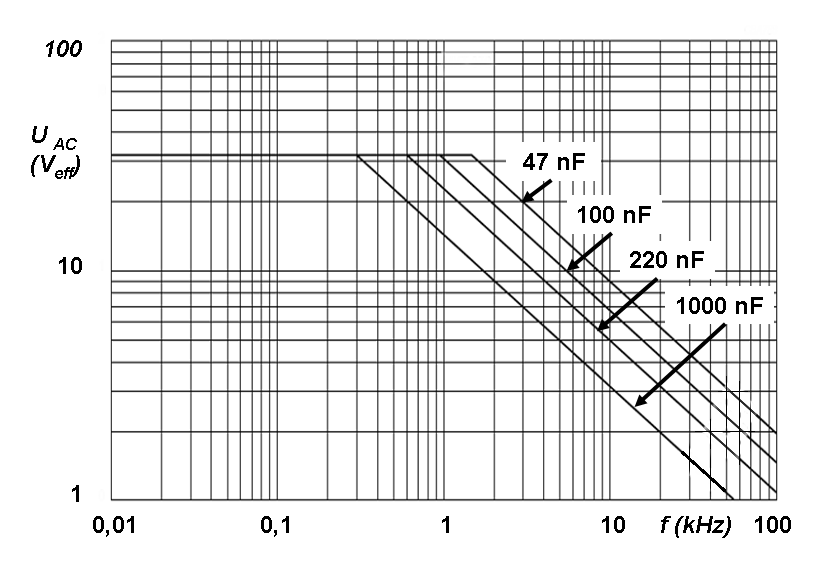
Typical RMS AC voltage curves as a function of frequency, for four different capacitance values of a 63 V DC capacitor series

Film capacitors are not polarized and are suitable for handling an alternating voltage. Because the rated AC voltage is specified as an RMS value, the nominal AC voltage must be smaller than the rated DC voltage. Typical figures for DC voltages and nominally related AC voltages are given in the table below:

Rated DC voltages and nominal 50/60 Hz AC voltages
Rated DC voltage	50 V	63 V	100 V	250 V	400 V	630 V	1000 V	1600 V	2000 V
Nominal rated AC voltage	30 V	40 V	63 V	160 V	220 V	250 V	350 V	550 V	700 V

An AC voltage will cause an AC current (with an applied DC bias this is also called "ripple current"), with cyclic charging and discharging of the capacitor causing oscillating motion of the electric dipoles in the dielectric. This results in dielectric losses, which are the principal component of the ESR of film capacitors, and which produce heat from the alternating current. The maximum RMS alternating voltage at a given frequency which may be applied continuously to a capacitor (up to the rated temperature) is defined as the rated AC voltage U_{R AC}. Rated AC voltages usually are specified at the mains frequency of a region (50 or 60 Hz).

The rated AC voltage is generally calculated so that an internal temperature rise of 8 to 10 K sets the allowed limit for film capacitors. These losses increase with increasing frequency, and manufacturers specify curves for derating maximum AC voltages permissible at higher frequencies.

Capacitors, including film types, designed for continuous operation at low-frequency (50 or 60 Hz) mains voltage, typically between line and neutral or line and ground for interference suppression, are required to meet standard safety ratings; e.g., X2 is designed to operate between line and neutral at 200-240 VAC, and Y2 between line and ground. These types are designed for reliability, and, in case of failure, to fail safely (open-, rather than short-circuit). A non-catastrophic failure mode in this application is due to the corona effect: the air enclosed in the winding element becomes ionized and consequently more conductive, allowing partial discharges on the metallized surface of the film, which causes local vaporization of the metallization. This occurs repeatedly, and can cause significant loss of capacitance (C-decay) over one or two years. International standard IEC60384-14 specifies a limit of 10% C-decay per 1,000 test hours (41 days of permanent connection). Some capacitors are designed to minimise this effect. One method, at the expense of increased size and cost, is for a capacitor operating at 200-240 VAC to consist internally of two parts in series, each at a voltage of 100-120 VAC, insufficient to cause ionisation. Manufacturers also adopt cheaper and smaller construction intended to avoid corona effect without series-connected sections, for example minimising enclosed air.

=== Surge ratings ===
For metallized film capacitors, the maximum possible pulse voltage is limited because of the limited current-carrying capacity between contact of the electrodes and the electrodes themselves. The rated pulse voltage V_{p} is the peak value of the pulse voltage which may be applied continuously to a capacitor at the rated temperature and at a given frequency. The pulse voltage capacity is given as pulse voltage rise time dV/dT in V/μs and also implies the maximum pulse current capacity. The values on the pulse rise time refer to the rated voltage. For lower operating voltages, the permissible pulse rise times may decrease. The permissible pulse load capacity of a film capacitor is generally calculated so that an internal temperature rise of 8 to 10 K is acceptable.

The maximum permissible pulse rise time of film capacitors which may be applied within the rated temperature range is specified in the relevant data sheets. Exceeding the maximum specified pulse load can lead to the destruction of the capacitor.

For each individual application, the pulse load must be calculated. A general rule for calculating the power handling of film capacitors is not available because of vendor-related differences stemming from the internal construction details of different capacitors. Therefore, the calculation procedure of the manufacturer WIMA is referenced as an example of the generally applicable principles.

=== Impedance, dissipation factor, and ESR ===
==== Impedance ====
Simplified series-equivalent circuit of a film capacitor for higher frequencies (above); vector diagram with electrical reactances and resistance ESR and for illustration the impedance and dissipation factor tan δ

The impedance $\ Z = |Z| e^{j\theta} \quad$ is the complex ratio of the voltage to the current in an alternating current (AC) circuit at a given frequency.

In data sheets of film capacitors, only the magnitude of the impedance |Z| will be specified, and simply written as "Z". The phase of the impedance is specified as dissipation factor $\tan \delta$.

If the series-equivalent values of a capacitor $R_{\mathrm{ESR}}$ and $X_C= -\frac{1}{\omega C}$ and $X_L=\omega L_{\mathrm{ESL}}$, and the frequency are known, then the impedance can be calculated with these values. The impedance $Z$ is then the sum of the geometric (complex) addition of the real and the reactive resistances.

$$Z=\sqrt{R_{\mathrm{ESR}}^2 + (X_\mathrm{C} + X_\mathrm{L})^2}$$

$$Z=\sqrt{R_{\mathrm{ESR}}^2 + (X_\mathrm{C} + (-X_\mathrm{L}))^2}$$

In the special case of resonance, in which the both reactive resistances $X_C= -\frac{1}{\omega C}$ and $X_L=\omega L_{\mathrm{ESL}}$ have the same value ($X_C=X_L$), then the impedance will only be determined by $R_{\mathrm{ESR}}$.

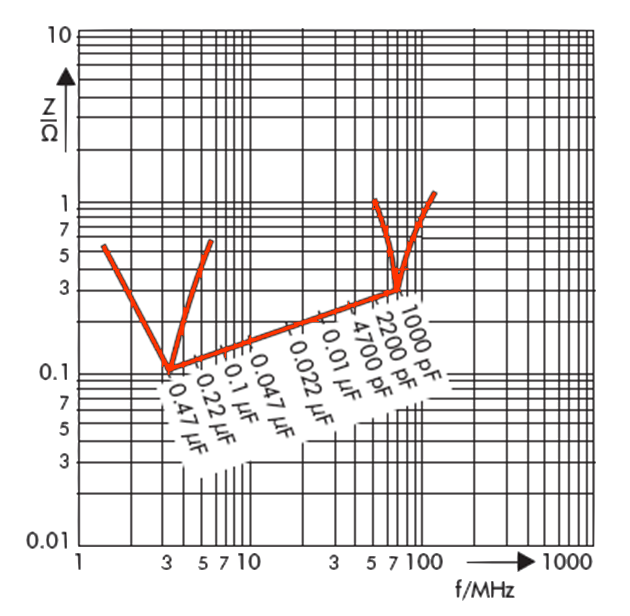
Typical curves of impedances for film capacitors with different capacitance values

The impedance is a measure of the ability of the capacitor to pass alternating currents. The lower the impedance, the more easily alternating currents can be passed through the capacitor. Film capacitors are characterized by very small impedance values and very high resonant frequencies, especially when compared to electrolytic capacitors.

==== Dissipation factor (tan δ) and ESR ====
The equivalent series resistance (ESR) summarizes all resistive losses of the capacitor. These are the supply line resistances, the contact resistance of the electrode contact, the line resistance of the electrodes and the dielectric losses in the dielectric film. The largest share of these losses is usually the dissipative losses in the dielectric.

For film capacitors, the dissipation factor tan δ will be specified in the relevant data sheets, instead of the ESR. The dissipation factor is determined by the tangent of the phase angle between the capacitive reactance X_{C} minus the inductive reactance X_{L} and the ESR.

If the inductance ESL is small, the dissipation factor can be approximated as:

$$\tan \delta = \mbox{ESR} \cdot \omega C$$

This reason for using the dissipation factor instead of the ESR is, that film capacitors were originally used mainly in frequency-determining resonant circuits. The reciprocal value of the dissipation factor is defined as the quality factor "Q". A high Q value is for resonant circuits a mark of the quality of the resonance.

The dissipation factor for film/foil capacitors is lower than for metallized film capacitors, due to lower contact resistance to the foil electrode compared to the metallized film electrode.

The dissipation factor of film capacitors is frequency-, temperature- and time-dependent. While the frequency- and temperature-dependencies arise directly from physical laws, the time dependence is related to aging and moisture adsorption processes.

Typical curves of the dissipation factor for different film materials, as a function of frequency and temperature

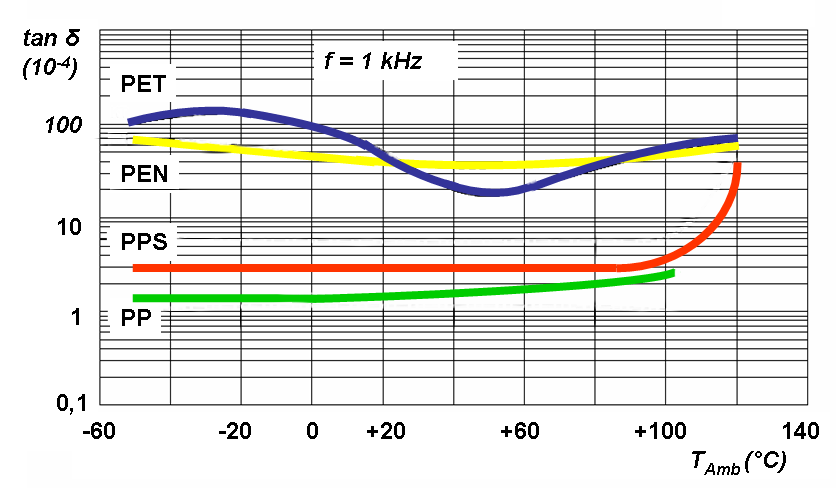
Dissipation factor of different film materials as a function of temperature

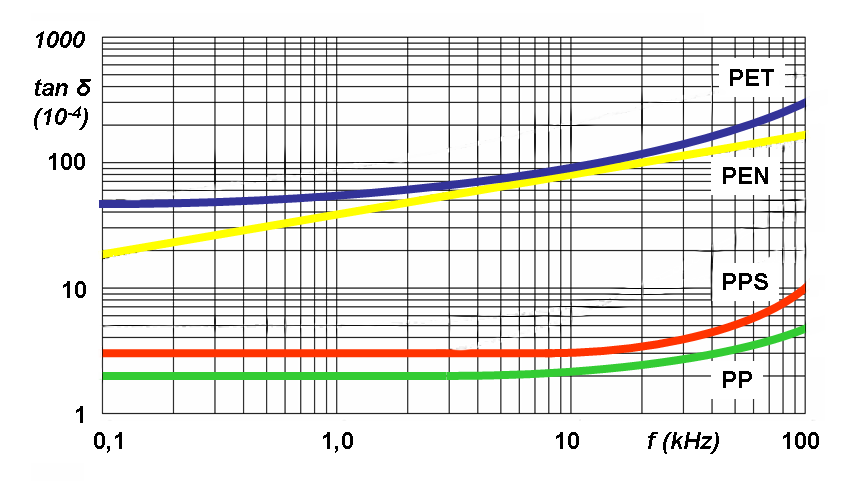
Dissipation factor of different film materials as a function of frequency

=== Insulation resistance ===
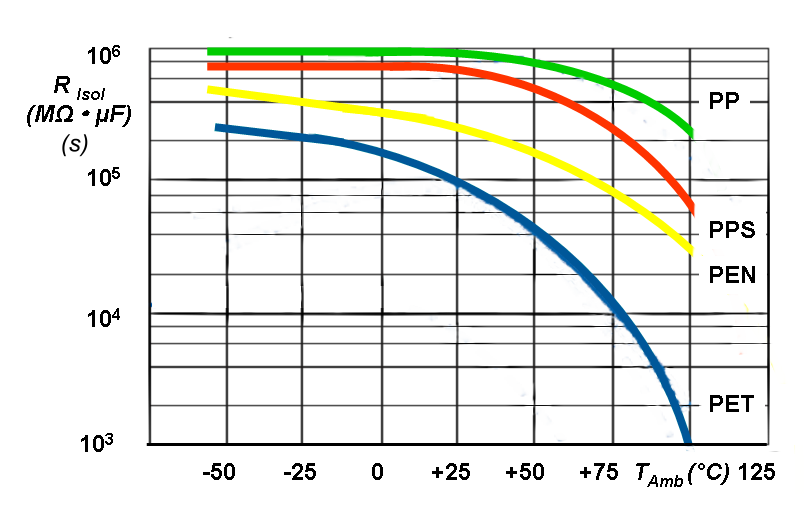
Typical graphs of insulation resistance $R_{isol}$ of different film capacitor types as a function of the temperature

A charged capacitor discharges over time through its own internal insulation resistance R_{isol}. The multiplication of the insulation resistance together with the capacitance of the capacitor results in a time constant which is called the "self-discharge time constant": (τ_{isol} = R_{isol}•C). This is a measure of the quality of the dielectric with respect to its insulating properties, and is dimensioned in seconds. Usual values for film capacitors range from 1000 s up to 1,000,000 s. These time constants are always relevant if capacitors are used as time-determining elements (such as timing delay), or for storing a voltage value as in sample-and-hold circuits or integrators.

=== Dielectric absorption (soakage) ===
Dielectric absorption is the name given to the effect by which a capacitor that has been charged for a long time discharges only incompletely when briefly discharged. It is a form of hysteresis in capacitor voltages. Although an ideal capacitor would remain at zero volts after being discharged, real capacitors will develop a small residual voltage, a phenomenon that is also called "soakage".

The following table lists typical values of the dielectric absorption for common film materials

Dielectric film material	Dielectric absorption
Polyester (PET)	0.2 to 0.5%
Polypropylene (PP)	0.01 to 0.1%
Polyethylene naphthalate (PEN)	1.0 to 1.2%
Polyphenylene sulfide (PPS)	0.05 to 0.1%

Polypropylene film capacitors have the lowest voltage values generated by dielectric absorption. Therefore, they are ideally suited for precision analog circuits, or for integrators and sample-and-hold circuits.

=== Aging ===
Film capacitors are subject to certain very small but measurable aging processes. The primary degradation process is a small amount of plastic film shrinkage, which occurs mainly during the soldering process, but also during operation at high ambient temperatures or at high current load. Additionally, some moisture absorption in the windings of the capacitor may take place under operating conditions in humid climates.

Thermal stress during the soldering process can change the capacitance value of leaded film capacitors by 1% to 5% from initial value, for example. For surface mount devices, the soldering process may change the capacitance value by as much as 10%. The dissipation factor and insulation resistance of film capacitors may also be changed by the above-described external factors, particularly by moisture absorption in high humidity climates.

The manufacturers of film capacitors can slow the aging process caused by moisture absorption, by using better encapsulation. This more expensive fabrication processing may account for the fact that film capacitors with the same basic body design can be supplied in different life time stability ratings called Performance grades. Performance grade 1 capacitors are "longlife", Performance grade 2 capacitors are "general purpose" capacitors. The specifications behind this grades are defined in the relevant standard of IEC/EN 60384-x (see standards).

The permissible changes of capacitance, dissipation factor and insulation resistance vary with the film material, and are specified in the relevant data sheet. Variations over the course of time which exceed the specified values are considered as a degradation failure.

=== Failure rate and life expectancy ===
Film capacitors generally are very reliable components with very low failure rates, with predicted life expectancies of decades under normal conditions. The life expectancy for film capacitors is usually specified in terms of applied voltage, current load, and temperature.

=== Markings ===
Color-coded film capacitors have been produced, but it is usual to print more detailed information on the body. According to the IEC standard 60384.1, capacitors should be marked with imprints of the following information:

- rated capacitance
- rated voltage
- tolerance
- category voltage
- year and month (or week) of manufacture
- manufacturer's name or trade mark
- climatic category
- manufacturer's type designation

Mains-voltage RFI suppression capacitors must also be marked with the appropriate safety agency approvals.

Capacitance, tolerance, and date of manufacture can be marked with short codes. Capacitance is often indicated with the sub-multiple indicator replacing an easily erased decimal point, as: n47 = 0.47 nF, 4n7 = 4.7 nF, 47n = 47 nF

== Applications ==
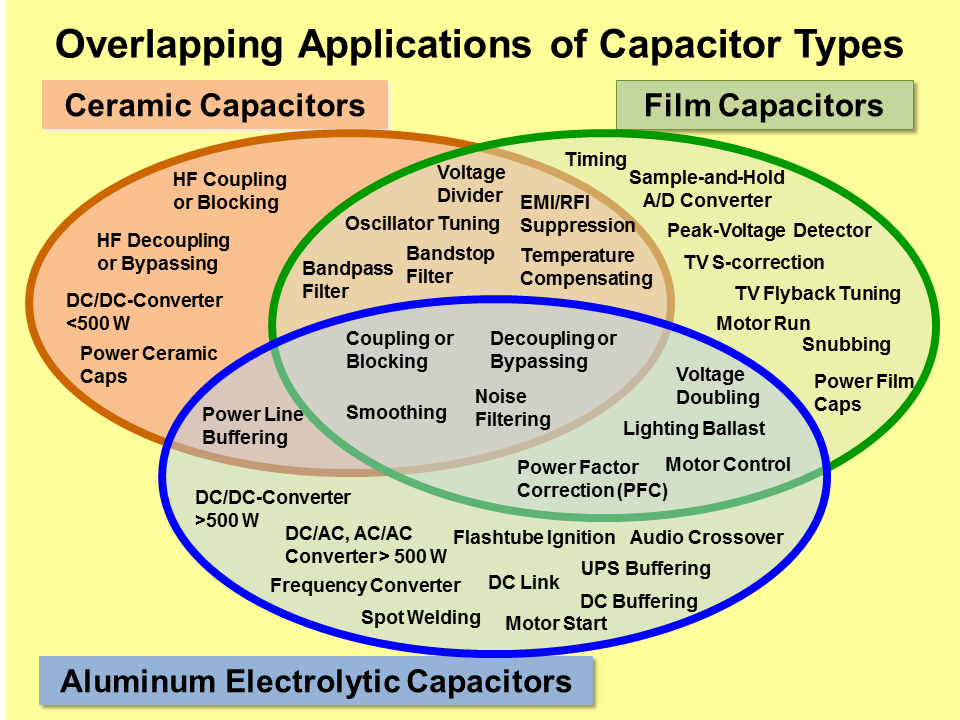
Film capacitors, ceramic capacitors and electrolytic capacitors do have a lot of common applications, which leads to overlapping use

In comparison with the other two main capacitor technologies, ceramic and electrolytic capacitors, film capacitors have properties that make them particularly well suited for many general-purpose and industrial applications in electronic equipment.

Two main advantages of film capacitors are very low ESR and ESL values. Film capacitors are physically larger and more expensive than aluminum electrolytic capacitors (e-caps), but have much higher surge and pulse load capabilities. As film capacitors are not polarized, they can be used in AC voltage applications without DC bias, and they have much more stable electrical parameters. Polypropylene film capacitors have relatively little temperature dependence of capacitance and dissipation factor, so that they can be applied in frequency-stable Class 1 applications, replacing Class 1 ceramic capacitors.

=== Electronic circuits ===
Some typical applications of film capacitors for use in electronic equipment

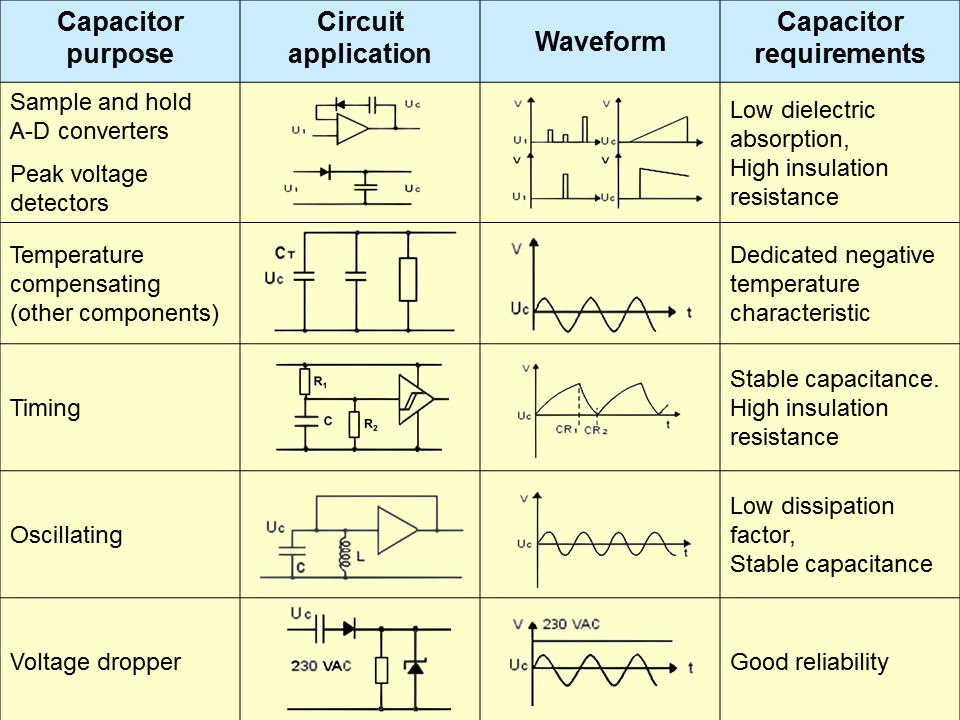

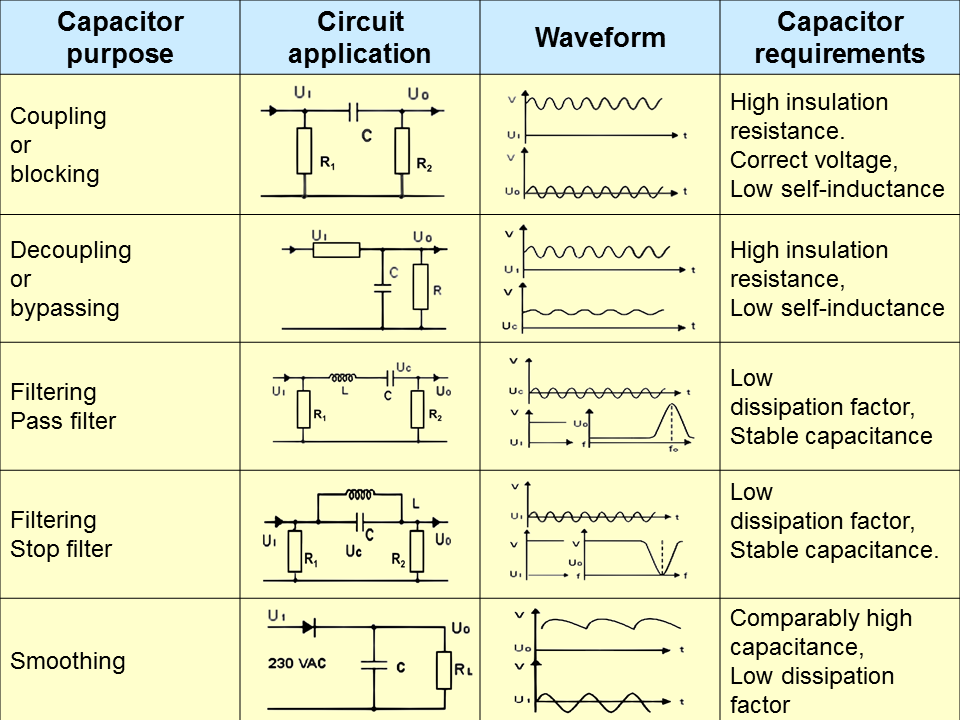

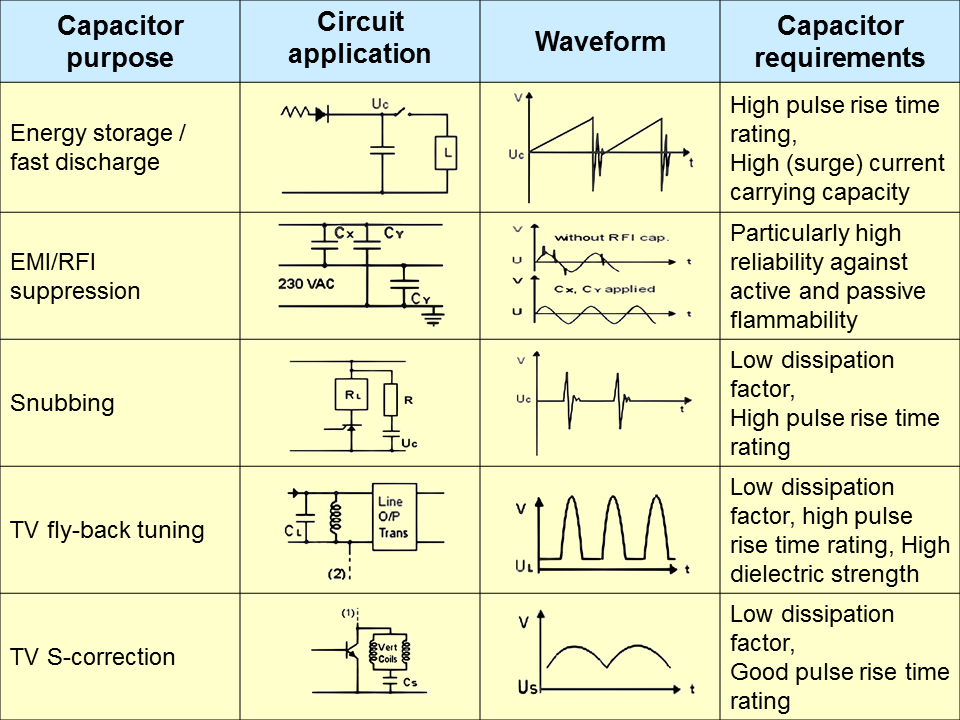

Polypropylene film capacitors meet the criteria for stability Class 1 capacitors, and have low electrical losses and nearly linear behavior over a very wide temperature and frequency range. They are used for oscillators and resonant circuits; for electronic filter applications with high quality factor (Q) such as high-pass filters, low-pass filters and band-pass filters as well as for tuning circuits; for audio crossovers in loudspeakers; in sample and hold A/D converters and in peak voltage detectors. Tight capacitance tolerances are required for timing applications in signal lights or pulse width generators to control the speed of motors, PP film capacitors are also well-suited because of their very low leakage current.

Class 1 PP film capacitors are able to handle higher current than stability Class 1 ceramic capacitors. The precise negative temperature characteristics of polypropylene make PP capacitors useful to compensate for temperature-induced changes in other components.

Fast pulse rise time rating, high dielectric strength (breakdown voltage), and low dissipation factor (high Q) are the reasons for the use of polypropylene film capacitors in fly-back tuning and S-correction applications in older CRT tube television and display equipment. For similar reasons, PP film capacitors, often in versions with special terminals for high peak currents, work well as snubbers for power electronic circuits. Because of their high pulse surge capabilities, PP capacitors are suitable for use in applications where high-current pulses are needed, such as in time-domain reflectometer (TDR) cable fault locators, in welding machines, defibrillators, in high-power pulsed lasers, or to generate high-energy light or X-ray flashes.

In addition, polypropylene film capacitors are used in many AC applications such as phase shifters for PFC in fluorescent lamps, or as a motor-run capacitors.

For simple higher-frequency filter circuits, or in voltage regulator or voltage doubler circuits, low-cost metallized polyester film capacitors provide long-term stability, and can replace more-expensive tantalum capacitors. Because capacitors pass AC signals but block DC, film capacitors with their high insulation resistance and low self-inductance are well-suited as signal coupling capacitors for higher frequencies. For similar reasons, film capacitors are widely used as decoupling capacitors to suppress noise or transients.

Film capacitors made with lower-cost plastics are used for non-critical applications which do not require ultra-stable characteristics over a wide temperature range, such as for smoothing or AC signal coupling. Polyester film (KT) capacitors of the "stacked" type are often used now instead of polystyrene capacitors (KS), which have become less available.

Metallized film capacitors have self-healing properties, and small imperfections do not lead to the destruction of the component, which makes these capacitors suitable for RFI/EMI suppression capacitors with fault protection against electrical shock and flame propagation, although repeated corona discharges which self-heal can lead to significant loss of capacitance.

PTFE film capacitors are used in applications that must withstand extremely high temperatures. such as in military equipment, in aerospace, in geological probes, or burn-in circuits.

=== Safety and EMI/RFI suppression film capacitors ===
RFI/EMI suppression capacitors

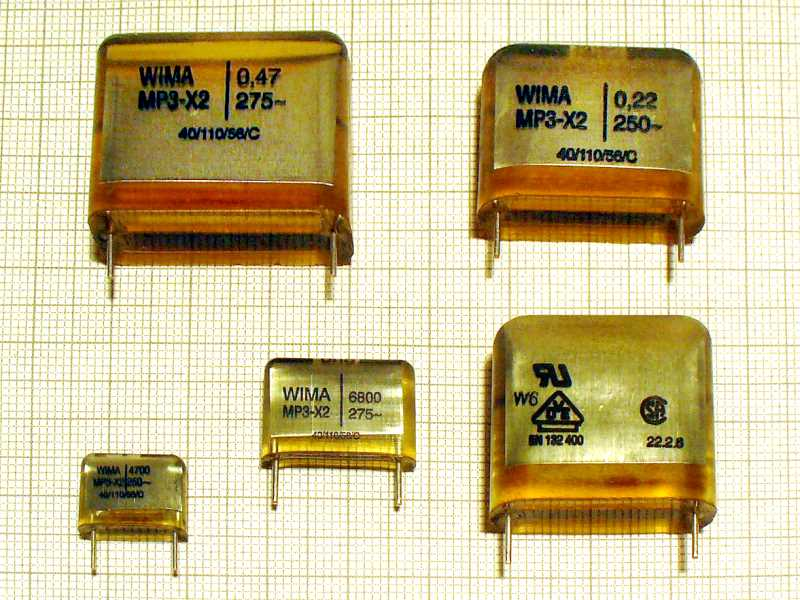
Metallized paper RFI suppression capacitors (MP3) with safety marks for “X2” safety standard

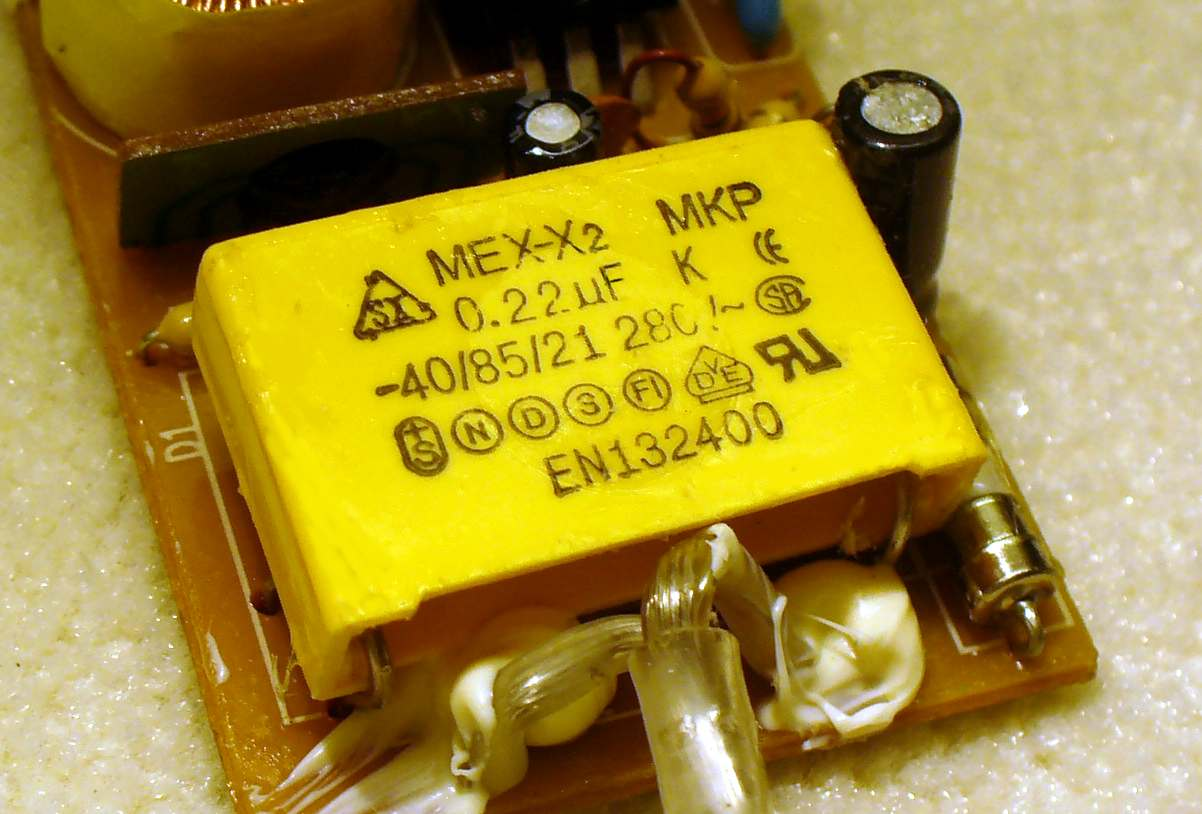
Metallized polypropylene RFI suppression capacitor (MKP) for "X2" safety standard

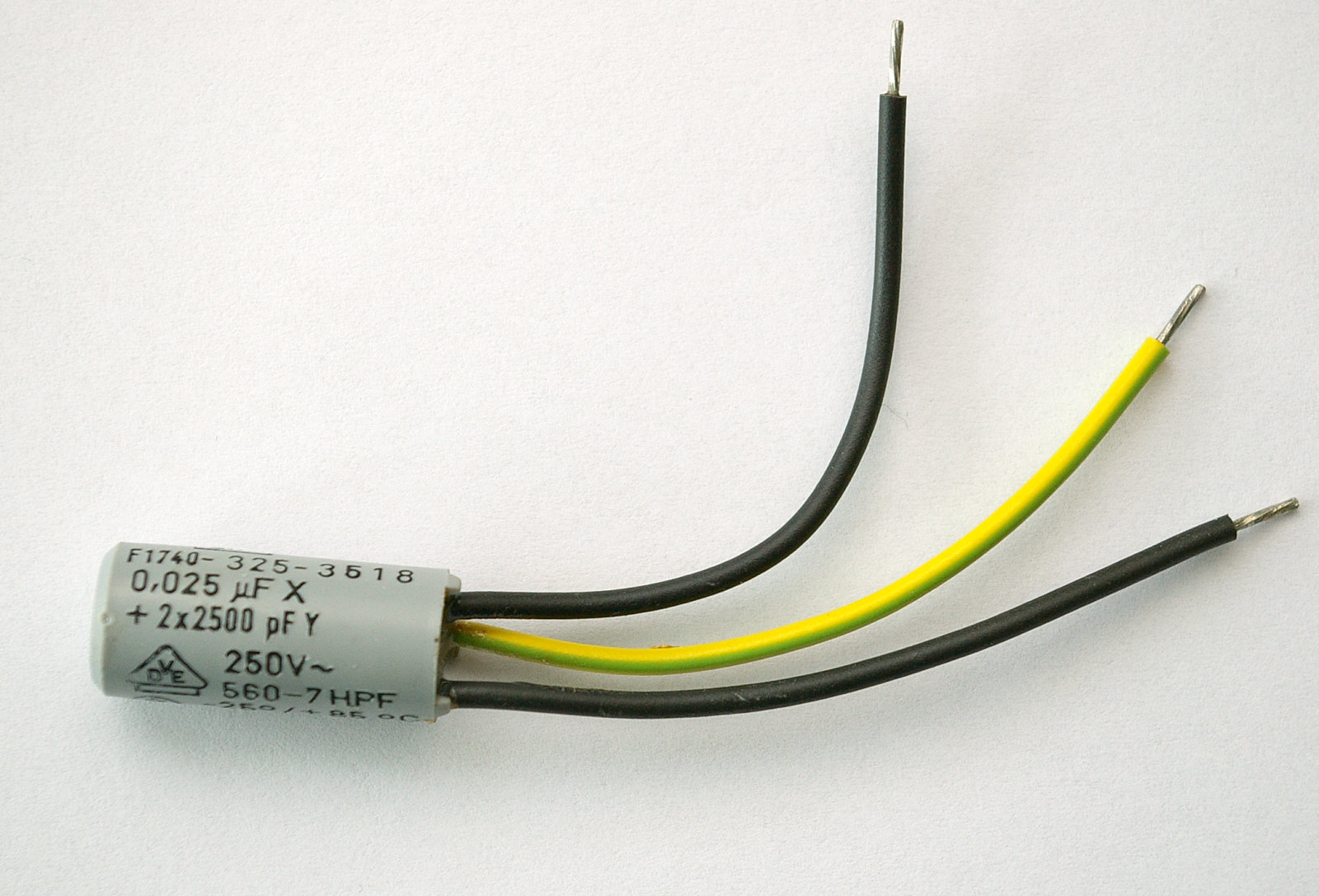
Combined XY-RFI suppression capacitor

Electromagnetic interference (EMI) or radio-frequency interference (RFI) suppression film capacitors, also known as "AC line filter safety capacitors" or "Safety capacitors", are used as crucial components to reduce or suppress electrical noise caused by the operation of electrical or electronic equipment, while also providing limited protection against electrical shocks.

A suppression capacitor is an effective interference reduction component because its electrical impedance decreases with increasing frequency, so that at higher frequencies they short circuit electrical noise and transients between the lines, or to ground. They therefore prevent equipment and machinery (including motors, inverters, and electronic ballasts, as well as solid-state relay snubbers and spark quenchers) from sending and receiving electromagnetic and radio frequency interference as well as transients in across-the-line (X capacitors) and line-to-ground (Y capacitors) connections. X capacitors effectively absorb symmetrical, balanced, or differential interference. On the other hand, Y capacitors are connected in a line bypass between a line phase and a point of zero potential, to absorb asymmetrical, unbalanced, or common-mode interference.

RFI/EMI suppression with X- and Y-capacitors for equipment without and with additional safety insulation

Appliance Class I capacitor connection

Appliance Class II capacitor connection

EMI/RFI suppression capacitors are designed and installed so that remaining interference or electrical noise does not exceed the limits of EMC directive EN 50081 Suppression components are connected directly to mains voltage semi-permanently for 10 to 20 years or more, and are therefore exposed to overvoltages and transients which could damage the capacitors. For this reason, suppression capacitors must comply with the safety and inflammability requirements of international safety standards such as the following:

- Europe: EN 60384-14,
- USA: UL 60384-14, UL 1283
- Canada: CAN/CSA-E60384-14, CSA C22.2, No. 8
- China: CQC (GB/T 6346.14-2015 or IEC 60384-14)

RFI capacitors which fulfill all specified requirements are imprinted with the certification mark of various national safety standards agencies. For power line applications, special requirements are placed on the inflammability of the coating and the epoxy resin impregnating or coating the capacitor body. To receive safety approvals, X and Y powerline-rated capacitors are destructively tested to the point of failure. Even when exposed to large overvoltage surges, these safety-rated capacitors must fail in a fail-safe manner that will not endanger personnel or property.

Most EMI/RFI suppression film capacitors are polyester (PET) or metallized polypropylene (PP) film capacitors. However, some types of metallized paper capacitors (MP) are still used for this application, because they still have some advantages in flame resistance.

Some safety capacitors have built-in capacitor discharge resistors.

=== Lighting ballasts ===
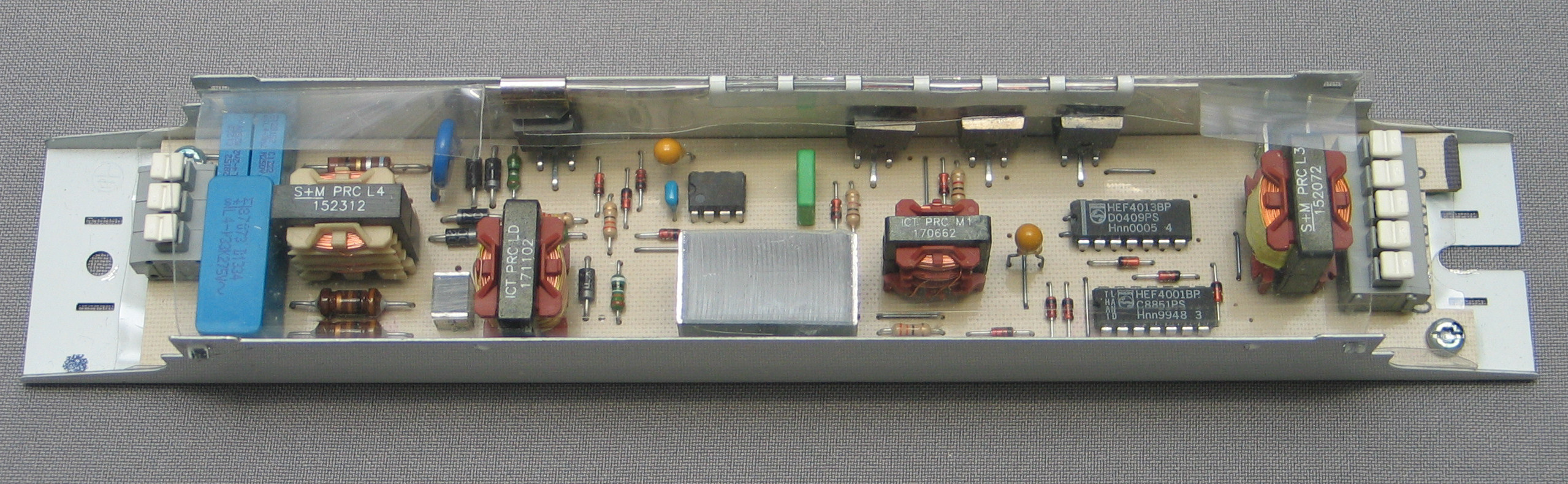
An opened electronic lighting ballast device with a "naked" non-encapsulated film capacitor (gray rectangle. mid-photo) for power-factor correction

A lighting ballast is a device to provide proper starting and operating electrical conditions to light one or more fluorescent lamps, while also limiting the amount of current. A familiar and widely used example is the traditional inductive ballast used in fluorescent lamps, to limit the current through the tube, which would otherwise rise to destructive levels due to the tube's negative resistance characteristic. A disadvantage of using an inductor is that current is shifted out of phase with the voltage, producing a poor power factor.

Modern electronic ballasts usually change the frequency of the power from a standard mains frequency of 50 or 60 Hz up to 40 kHz or higher, often using a Switched Mode Power Supply (SMPS) circuit topology with PFC. First the AC input power is rectified to DC, and then it is chopped at a high frequency to improve the power factor. In more expensive ballasts, a film capacitor is often paired with the inductor to correct the power factor. In the picture at right, the flat grey rectangular component in the middle of the ballast circuit is a polyester film capacitor used for PFC.

=== Snubber / Damping capacitors ===
Snubber film capacitors

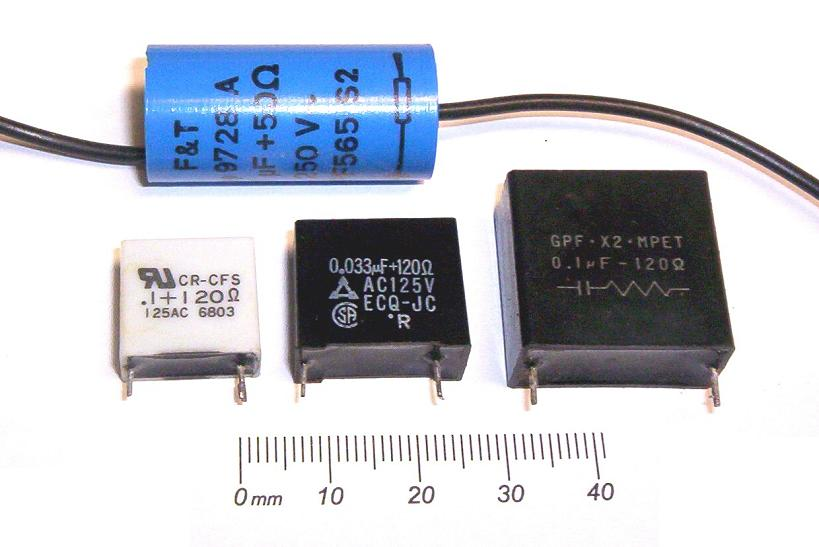
RC snubbers, a simple RC circuit with a small resistor (R) in series with a small film capacitor (C) in a common case

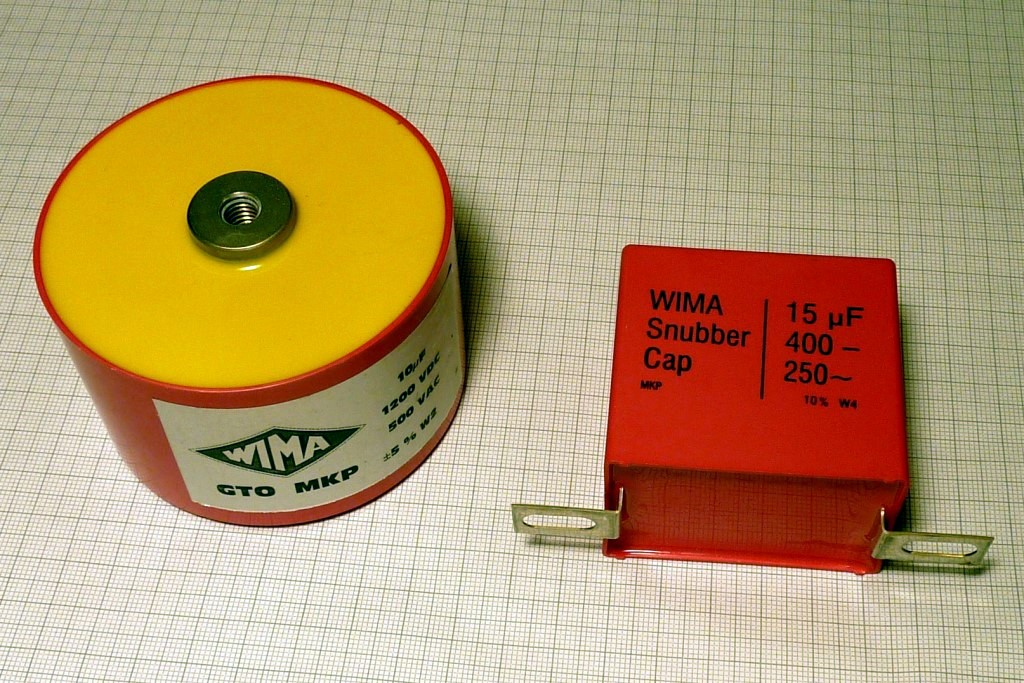
Snubber film capacitors with heavy-duty terminals for higher-power electronic applications

Snubber capacitors are designed for the high peak current operation required for protection against transient voltages. Such voltages are caused by the high "di/dt" current slew rate generated in switching power electronics applications.

Snubbers are energy-absorbing circuits used to eliminate voltage spikes caused by circuit inductance when a switch opens. The purpose of the snubber is to improve electromagnetic compatibility (EMC) by eliminating the voltage transient that occurs when a switch abruptly opens, or by suppressing sparking of switch contacts (such as an automotive ignition coil with mechanical interrupter), or by limiting the voltage slew rate of semiconductor switches like thyristors, GTO thyristors, IGBTs and bipolar transistors. Snubber capacitors (or higher power "damping capacitors") require a very low self-inductance and very low ESR capacitor construction. These devices are also expected to be highly reliable because, if the snubber RC circuitry fails, a power semiconductor will be destroyed in most cases.

Snubber circuits usually incorporate film capacitors, mostly polypropylene film caps. The most important criteria for this application are a low self-inductance, low ESR, and very high peak current capability. The so-called "snubber" capacitors sometimes have some additional special construction features. The self-inductance is reduced by slimmer designs with narrower width of the electrodes. By double-sided metallization or the film/foil construction of the electrodes, the ESR also can be reduced, increasing the peak current capability. Specially widened terminals which can be mounted directly beneath semiconductor packages can help to increase current handling and decrease inductance.

The most popular simple snubber circuit consists out of a film capacitor and a resistor in series, connected in parallel with a semiconductor component to suppress or damp undesirable voltage spikes. The capacitor absorbs the inductive turn-off peak current temporarily, so that the resulting voltage spike is limited. But the trend in modern semiconductor technology is towards higher power applications, which increases the peak currents and switching speeds. In this case, the boundary between a standard electronic film capacitor and a power capacitor is blurred, so that larger snubber capacitors belong more in the area of power systems, electrical installations and plants.

The overlapping categories of film and power capacitors are visible when they are applied as snubber capacitors in the growing market for high power electronics with IGBT's and thyristors. Although the power capacitors use polypropylene film, like the smaller snubber film capacitors, they belong to the family of power capacitors, and are called "damping" capacitors.

=== Power film capacitors ===
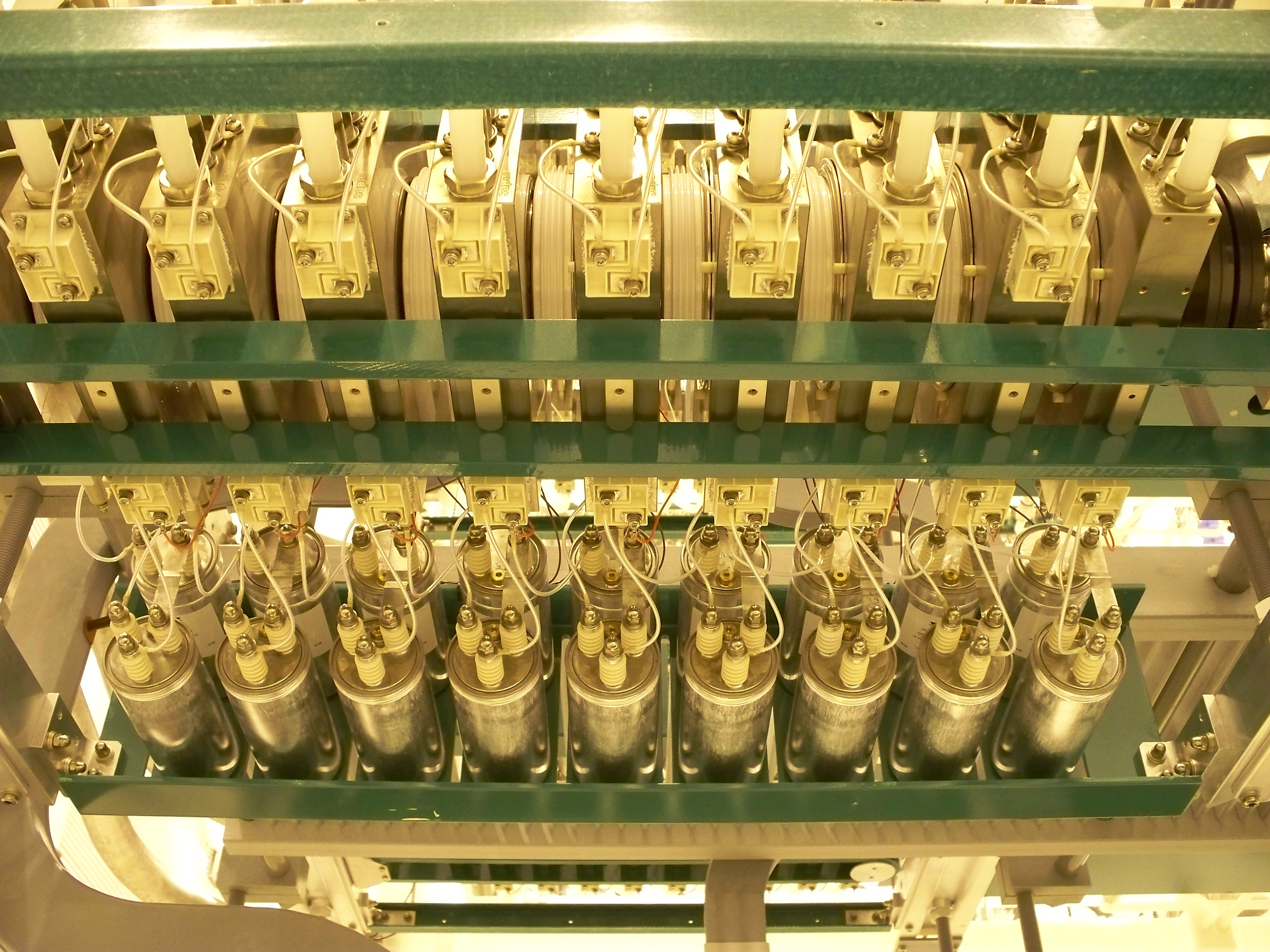
Power capacitors for higher power snubbing in a thyristor electronic control for HVDC transmission at Hydro-Québec fulfill the same snubber functions as film snubbers, but belong to the family of power capacitors

Power film capacitors with screw terminals for applications in power systems, electrical installations and plants

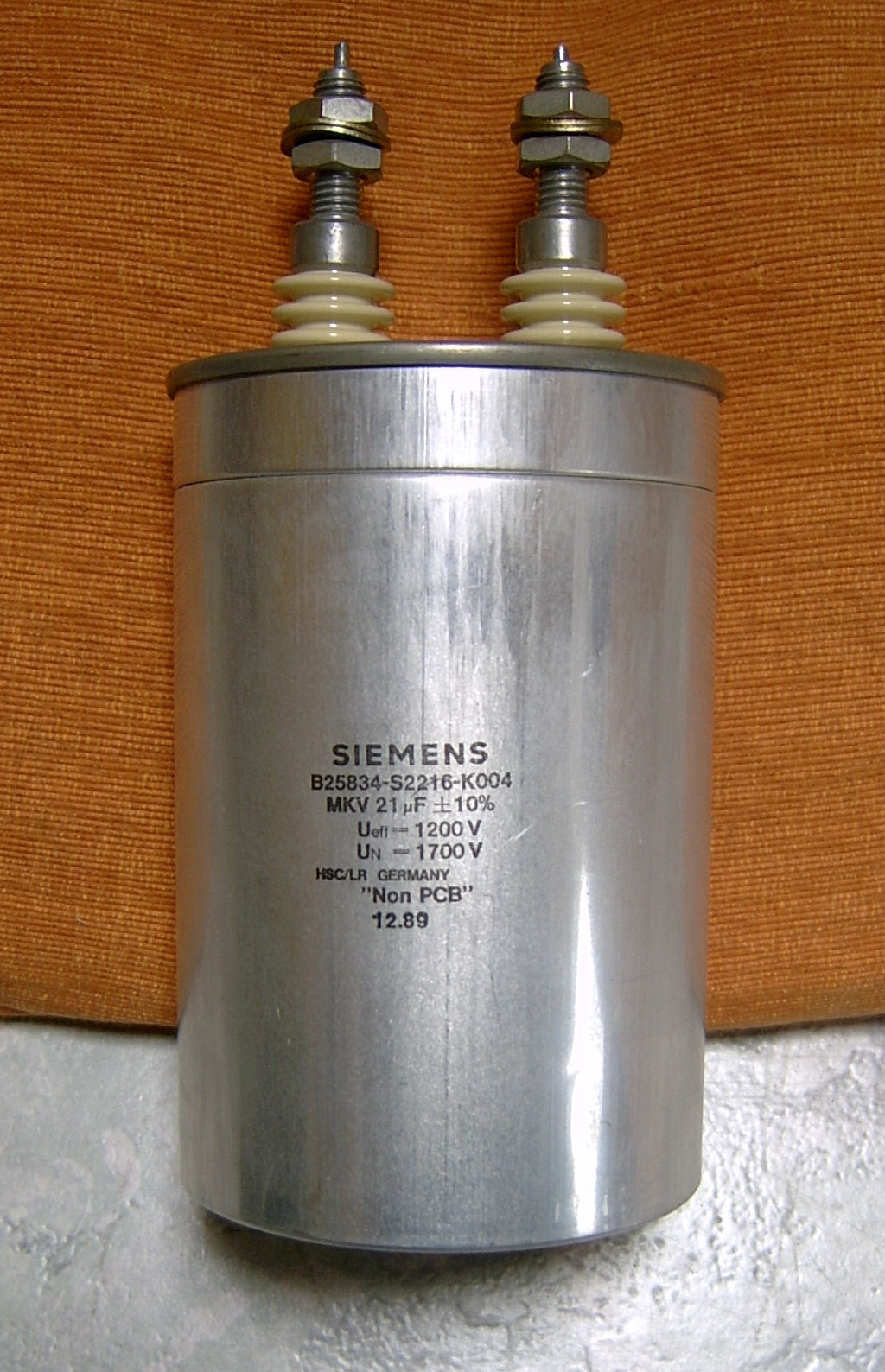
Power film capacitor for PFC, packaged in a cylindrical metal can

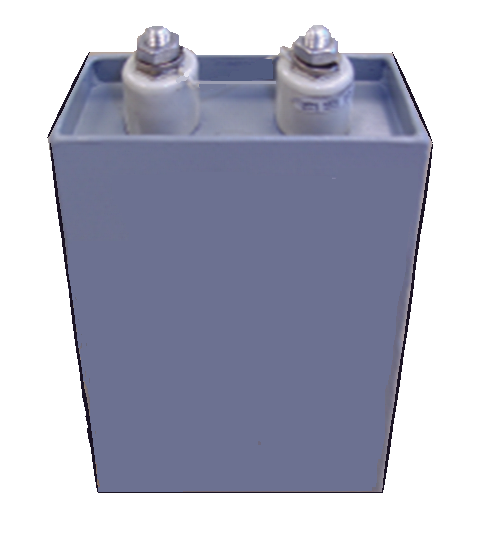
Power film capacitor in rectangular housing

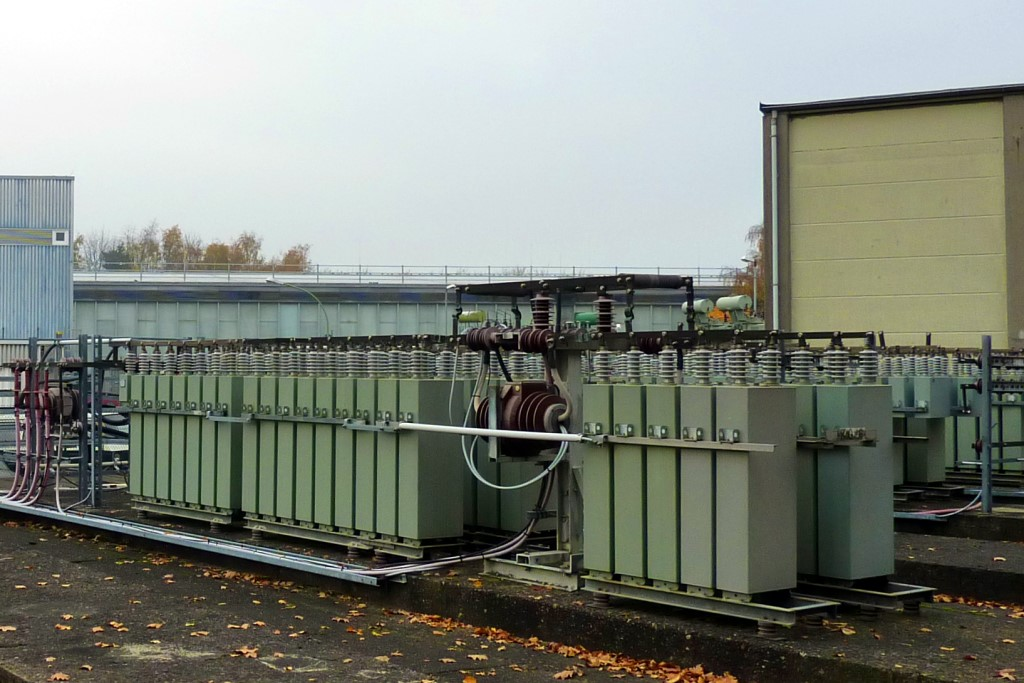
One of several energy storage power film capacitor banks, for magnetic field generation at the Hadron-Electron Ring Accelerator (HERA), located on the DESY site in Hamburg

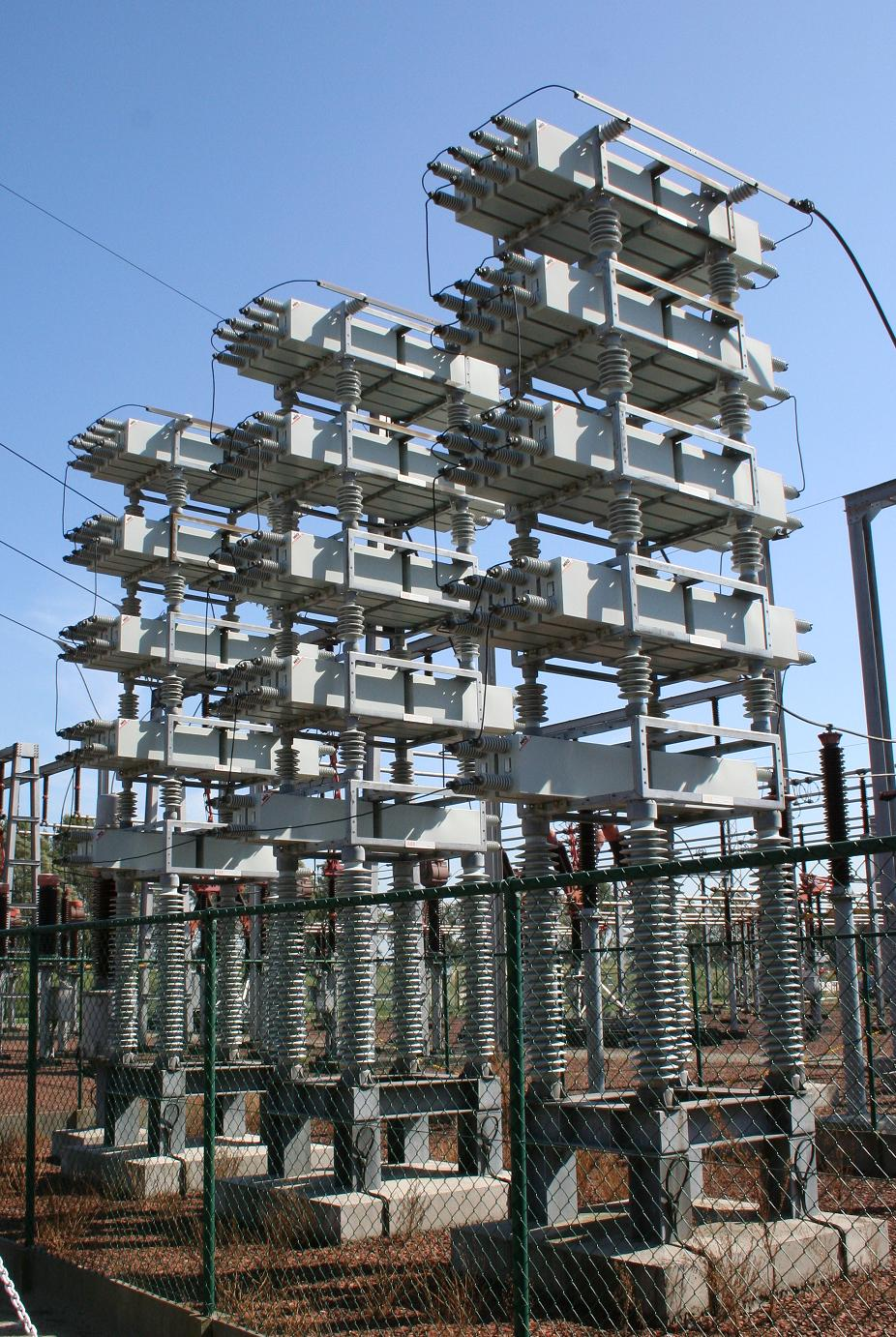
Capacitor bank with 75 MVA for PFC of 150 kV transmission lines

The relatively simple fabrication technique of winding gives film capacitors the possibility of attaining even very large sizes for applications in the high power range, as so-called "power capacitors". Although the materials and the construction of power capacitors are mostly similar to the smaller film capacitors, they are specified and marketed differently for historical reasons.

The "film capacitors" were developed together with the growing market of broadcast and electronic equipment technology in the mid-20th century. These capacitors are standardized under the rules of IEC/EN 60384-1 "Capacitors for use in electronic equipment" and different "film materials" have their own sub standards, the IEC/EN 60384-n series. The "power capacitors" begin at a power handling capacity of approximately 200 volt-amps, such as for ballast capacitors in fluorescent lamps. The standardization of power capacitors follows the rules of IEC/EN 61071 and IEC/EN 60143–1, and have for various different applications their own sub standards, such as for railway applications.

Power capacitors can be used for a wide variety of applications, even where extremely non-sinusoidal voltages and pulsed currents are present. Both AC and DC capacitors are available. AC capacitors serve as damping or snubbing capacitors when connected in series with a resistor, and are also specified for the damping of undesirable voltage spikes caused by the so-called charge carrier storage effect during switching of power semiconductors. In addition, AC capacitors are used in low-detuned or close-tuned filter circuits for filtering or absorbing harmonics. As pulse discharge capacitors, they are useful in applications with reversing voltages, such as in magnetizing equipment.

The scope of application for DC capacitors is similarly diverse. Smoothing capacitors are used to reduce the AC component of fluctuating DC voltage (such as in power supplies for radio and television transmitters), and for high voltage testing equipment, DC controllers, measurement and control technology and cascaded circuits for generation of high DC voltage. Supporting capacitors, DC-filter or buffer circuit capacitors are used for energy storage in intermediate DC circuits, such as in frequency converters for poly-phase drives, and transistor and thyristor power converters. They must be able to absorb and release very high currents within short periods, the peak values of currents being substantially greater than the RMS values.

Surge (pulse) discharge capacitors are also capable of supplying or absorbing extreme short-duration current surges. They are usually operated in discharge applications with non-reversing voltages, and at low repetition frequencies, such as in laser technology and lighting generators.

Power capacitors can reach quite large physical dimensions. Rectangular housings with internally interconnected individual capacitors can reach sizes of L×W×H = (350×200×1000) mm and above.

=== Advantages ===
- Polypropylene film capacitors can qualify for Class 1 applications
- Very low dissipation factors (tan δ), high quality factors (Q) and low inductance values (ESL)
- No microphonics compared with ceramic capacitors
- Metallized construction has self-healing properties
- High rated voltages, up to the range of kV possible
- Much higher ripple current, compared with electrolytic capacitors
- Much lower aging, compared with electrolytic capacitors of similar values
- High and very high surge current pulses possible

=== Disadvantages ===
- Larger physical size compared to electrolytic capacitors
- Limited number of types in surface-mount technology (SMT) packaging
- Film/foil types have no self-healing capability (irreversible short circuit)
- Possibly flammable under overload conditions

== See also ==
- Ceramic capacitors
- Decoupling capacitor
- Electrolytic capacitors
- Equivalent series inductance (ESL)
- Equivalent series resistance (ESR)
- List of capacitor manufacturers
- Types of capacitors
