= ESD simulator =

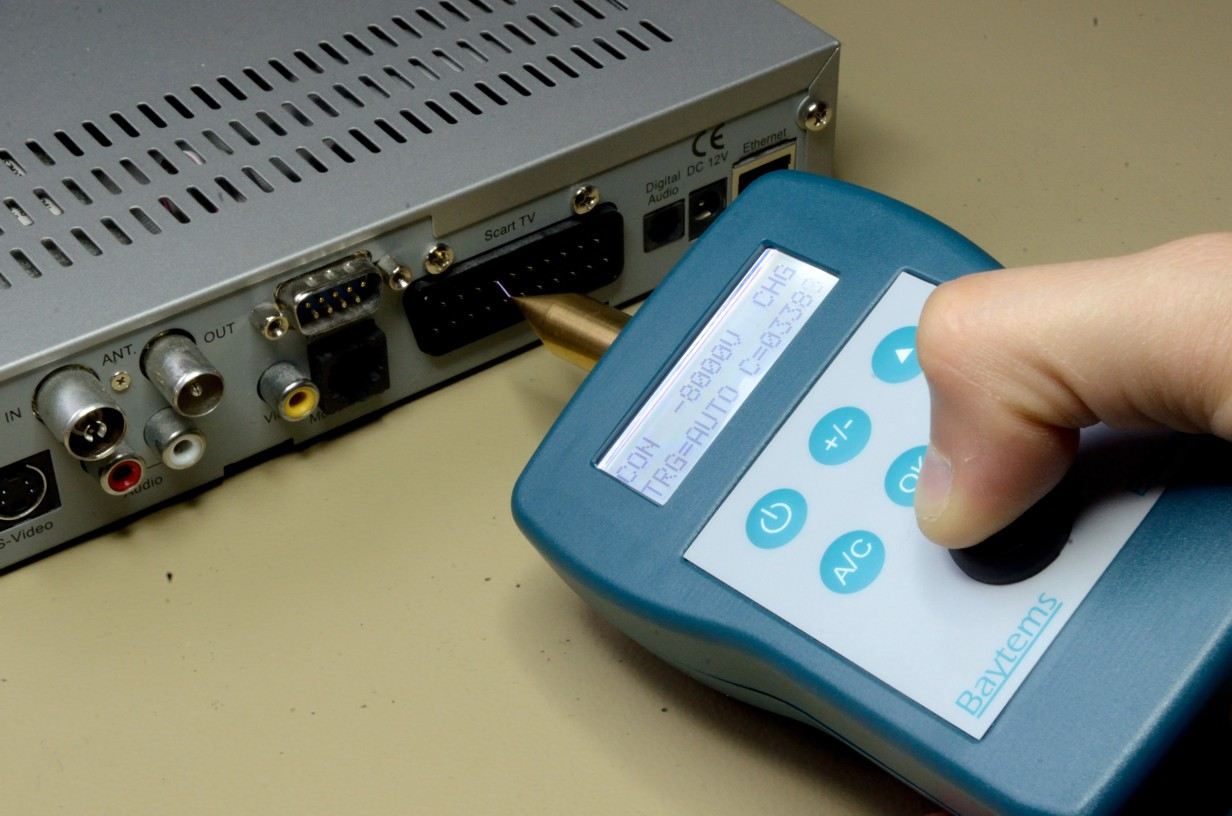
Testing consumer equipment with a hand-held ESD simulator (ESD gun)

An ESD simulator is a handheld or benchtop unit used to test the immunity of devices to electrostatic discharge (ESD). These simulators are used in special electromagnetic compatibility (EMC) or electrostatic dicharge (ESD) laboratories. ESD pulses are fast, high-voltage pulses created when two objects with different electrical charges come into close proximity or contact. Recreating them in a test environment helps to verify that the device under test is immune to static electricity discharges.

ESD testing is necessary to receive a CE mark, and for most suppliers of components for motor vehicles as part of required electromagnetic compatibility testing. It is often useful to automate these tests to eliminate the human factor.

There are three distinct test models for electrostatic discharge: human-body model (HBM), machine model (MM), and charged-devices model (CDM). The human-body model emulates the action of a human body discharging static electricity, the machine model simulates static discharge from a machine, and the charged-device model simulates the charging and discharging events that occur in production processes and equipment.

Many ESD guns have interchangeable modules containing different discharge Networks or RC Modules (Specific resistance and capacitance values) to simulate different discharges. These modules typically slide into the handle of the pistol portion of the ESD simulator, much like loading some handguns. They change the characteristics of the waveshape discharged from the pistol and are called out in general standards like IEC 61000-4-2, SAE J113 and industry specific standards like ISO 10605. Resistance is referred to in ohms (Ω), capacitance is referred to in picofarad (pF or "puff"). The most commonly used discharge network is for IEC 61000-4-2 and ISO 10605, expressed as 150pF/330Ω. There are over 50 combinations of resistance and capacitance depending on the standards and the applicable electronics.

== Automated ESD Test Platforms ==
In professional engineering practice, execution of the test procedures defined in IEC 61000-4-2, ISO 10605 and equivalent national standards is increasingly performed on automated ESD test platforms. These platforms integrate multi-axis collaborative robotic arms to execute repeatable electrode trajectories across the surfaces of the device under test. Typical engineering features include automatic interchange of contact-discharge and air-discharge electrode tips, three-dimensional graphical programming of test-point coordinates, real-time correction of device positioning offsets, and integrated instrumentation for post-discharge functional verification, including detection of hard failures in displays, touch interfaces and sensors.

Charge neutralization on the device under test is managed through controlled leakage paths (commonly 470 kΩ) and automated discharge sequences, including support for USB charging control. The platforms are designed for compatibility with standard commercial ESD generators and are suitable for testing compact consumer electronic products such as mobile phones, tablets, earphones and wearable devices. They incorporate safety-rated interlocks, dual-hand actuation and presence-sensing devices to protect operators during high-voltage testing. Automated implementations provide improved metrological consistency compared with manual methods, particularly for devices with complex surface geometries or dense arrays of test locations, while maintaining full conformance to the waveform parameters and procedural requirements of the governing standards.

== Test standards ==
Standards that require ESD testing include:

- ISO 10605
- Ford EMC
- ISO/EN 61000-4-2 needed for the CE mark
- IEC 61000-4-2
- ISO TR10605
- MIL-STD-883
- MIL-STD-1512
- GR-78-CORE
- RTCA/DO 160
