= Line Impedance Stabilization Network =

Tool used in emissions testing

A Line Impedance Stabilization Network (LISN) is a specialized electronic device used in Electromagnetic compatibility (EMC) testing to provide a stable and known impedance to the power input of a Device under test (DUT) / Equipment under test (EUT), as specified in various EMC/EMI test standards (e.g., by CISPR, International Electrotechnical Commission, CENELEC, U.S. Federal Communications Commission, MIL-STD, DO-160 Sections 20-21-22).

Its primary functions are to isolate the EUT from external electrical noise, provide a consistent impedance for accurate Radio frequency (RF) noise measurements, and act as a low-pass filter. The LISN is typically placed between an AC or DC power source and the EUT.

LISNs may also be used to predict conducted emission for diagnostic and pre-compliance testing.

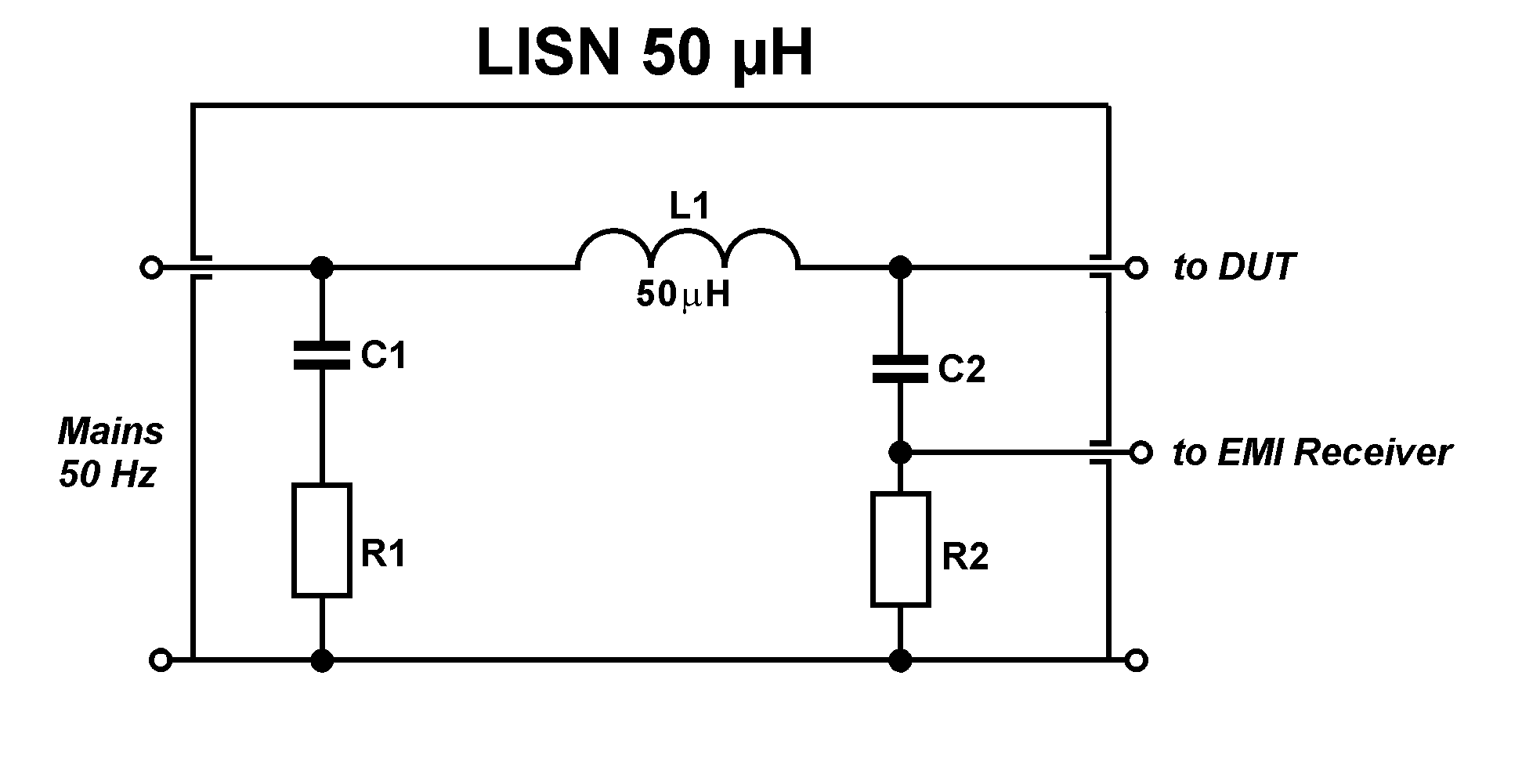
LISN block diagram. This is standard diagram of a typical LISN. Part values for a particular standard (MIL-STD 461E): C1=8μF, R1=5Ω, C2=250nF, R2=1kΩ

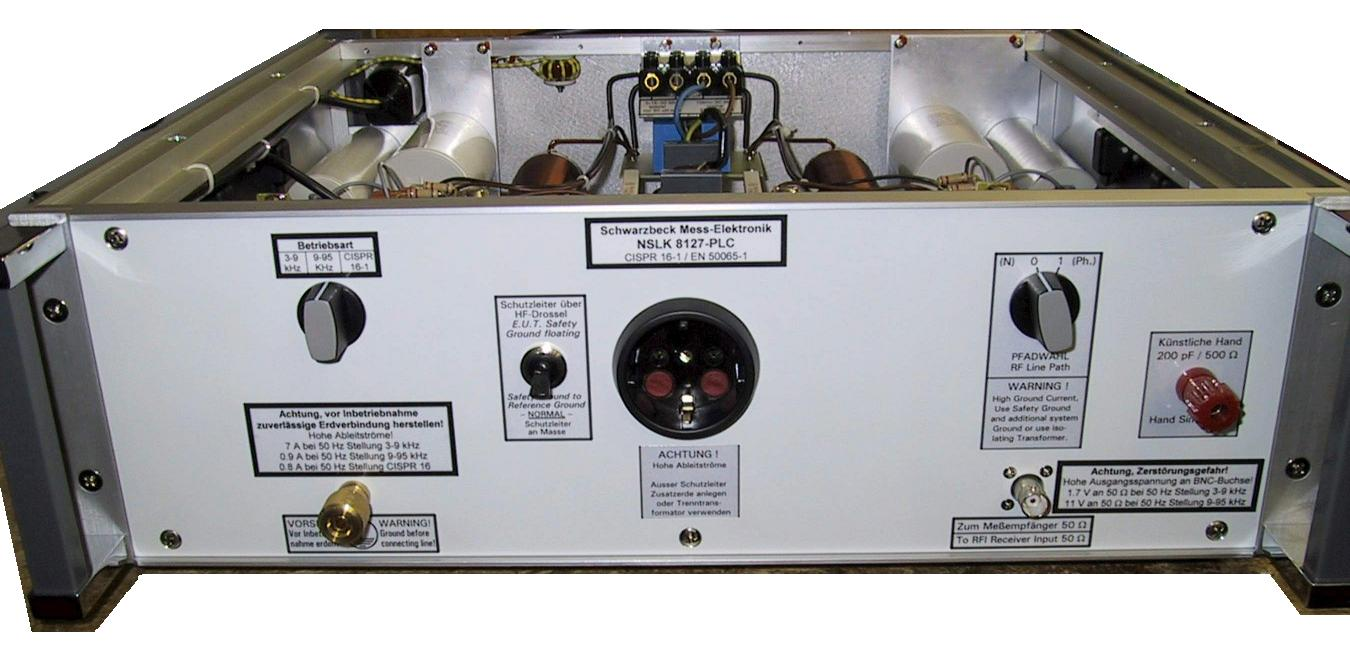
Image showing a standard LISN with top cover removed

== Functions of a LISN ==
LISNs serve three core functions in EMC testing

=== Stable line impedance ===
LISNs provide a precise and stable impedance to the power input of the EUT, typically 50Ω, recommended for obtaining repeatable measurements of conducted noise. The LISN is designed to simulate characteristics of the power grid at specific frequencies of interest. This ensures that the test setup accurately represents the operating conditions of the DUT, enabling consistent and comparable measurements across different testing environments and devices.

The impedance of a LISN is primarily determined by the inductance (L) and capacitance (C) in its circuit. At low frequencies, the impedance is dominated by the inductance, while at higher frequencies, the impedance approaches the characteristic 50 Ω resistor value. The impedance profile is designed to match the requirements of specific EMC standards, such as CISPR16-1-2, MIL-STD-461, and ISO 7637

The impedance of the power source varies, depending on the geometry of the supply wiring behind it.

The anticipated inductance of the power line for the intended installation of the EUT plays a role in identifying the correct type of LISN needed for testing. For example, a connection in a building will often use 50 μH inductor, whereas in automobile measurement standards a 5 μH inductor is used to emulate a shorter typical wire length.

=== Isolation from External Noise ===
Another important function of a LISN is to prevent the high-frequency noise of the power source from coupling in the system. A LISN functions as a low-pass filter, which provides high impedance to the outside RF noise while allowing the low-frequency power to flow through to the EUT.

=== Safe Measurement Interface ===
LISNs provide a measurement port with a stabilized 50 Ω impedance that safely connects to sensitive measurement equipment such as spectrum analyzers or EMI receivers. The LISN's design includes DC rejection and RF coupling features that protect the measurement equipment from transients and high voltages. This ensures that the high-frequency noise signal from the EUT can be coupled to the measuring equipment without risk of damage to the sensitive inputs..

The measurement port is typically connected via a coaxial cable, providing a defined impedance and minimizing signal reflections.

== Design and Components ==
Under a particular EMC test standard, a specific LISN type is required for evaluating and characterizing the operation of the EUT.

Different types of LISNs are available for analyzing DC, single-phase or 3-phase AC power connections. The main parameters for selecting the proper type of LISN are impedance, insertion loss, voltage rating, current rating, number of power conductors and connector types. The upper frequency limit of the LISN also plays an important role when conducted emissions measurements are used for predicting radiated emissions problems. A 100 MHz LISN is used in those cases.

== Types of LISNs ==
Type	Inductance	Applications	Standards	Frequency Range
V-LISN	5 μH / 50 μH	Automotive, general EMC	CISPR 25, ISO 7637, CISPR 16	10 kHz–100 MHz / 9 kHz–30 MHz
Delta LISN	50 μH	Separate CM/DM measurements	CISPR 16	9 kHz–30 MHz
T-ISN	Custom	Telecommunications, data lines	CISPR 22	100 kHz–100 MHz
3-Phase LISN	50 μH	Industrial equipment	CISPR 16, MIL-STD-461	9 kHz–30 MHz
High-Voltage LISN	50 μH	Military, aerospace	DO-160, MIL-STD-461	10 kHz–400 MHz

LISNs come in various types tailored to different applications and standards ^{[6]}

Type	Description
V-LISN	the most common type, used in automotive and general EMC testing to measure unsymmetric disturbance voltages between lines and ground. Available in 5 μH and 50 μH variants to match different power system sizes and standards.
Delta LISN	used for separating common-mode and differential-mode signals in conducted emissions testing, particularly in CISPR 16 applications.
T-ISN	designed for measuring emissions on data lines and are used in telecommunication and data transmission equipment testing.
3-Phase LISN	used for industrial equipment testing, providing stable impedance for three-phase power connections.
High-Voltage LISN	designed for military and aerospace applications, handling high voltages and currents, and providing stable impedance over a wide frequency range.
