= Dual-voltage =

Dual-voltage could refer to:

- Multi-system (rail), in which the trains are able to operate on more than one railway electrification system
- Dual-voltage CPU, in which a CPU can supply a different output voltage than the input
- 42-volt electrical system, automotive wiring, where some implementations run combined 14 V/42 V electrics
- Mains electricity, for North American household 120 V/240 V grid power systems
