= Human-body model =

Damage susceptibility model

Warning label for an electrostatic sensitive device, denoting the devices susceptibility to damage. A similar symbol without the bar and with a black "dome" denotes ESD-safe equipment.

The human-body model (HBM) is the most commonly used model for characterizing the susceptibility of an electronic device to damage from electrostatic discharge (ESD). The model is a simulation of the discharge which might occur when a human touches an electronic device.

The HBM definition most widely used is the test model defined in the United States military standard, MIL-STD-883, Method 3015.9, Electrostatic Discharge Sensitivity Classification. This method establishes a simplified equivalent electrical circuit and the necessary test procedures required to model an HBM ESD event.

An internationally widely used standard is JEDEC standard JS-001.

HBM is used primarily for manufacturing environments to quantify an integrated circuit to survive the manufacturing process. A similar standard, IEC 61000-4-2, is used for system level testing and quantifies protection levels for a real world ESD event in an uncontrolled environment.

== Model ==
In both JS-001-2012 and MIL-STD-883H the charged human body is modeled by a 100 pF capacitor and a 1500 ohm discharging resistance. During testing, the capacitor is fully charged to several kilovolts (2 kV, 4 kV, 6 kV and 8 kV are typical standard levels) and then discharged through the resistor connected in series to the device under test.

== See also ==
- Charged-device model
- Transmission-line pulse
