= IEC 61000-4-4 =

Electrotechnical immunity standard

IEC 61000-4-4 is the International Electrotechnical Commission's immunity standard based on electrical fast transient (EFT) / burst transients. This publication is part of the greater IEC 61000 group of standards which is covered under IEC TR 61000-4-1:2016. The current third version of this standard (2012) replaces the second version (2004). The goal of this standard is to establish a common and reproducible reference for evaluating the immunity of electrical and electronic equipment when subjected to electrical fast transient/bursts on supply, signal, control and earth ports.

EFT test levels (IEC/EN 61000-4-4)
Power ports, earth ports (PE)
Level	Voltage peak (kV)	Repetition frequency (kHz)
1	.5 kV	5 or 100 kHz
2	1 kV	5 or 100 kHz
3	2 kV	5 or 100 kHz
4	4 kV	5 or 100 kHz
x	special	special
x can be any level specified in product specific standards

Note: This tables purpose is a quick overview. It does not contain the same level of detail as the official IEC 61000-4-4.

The cause of electrical fast transients (EFT) come from an arc when mechanical contact is open due to a switching process. Given the fast rise time and voltage of these pulses having a solid ground connection is important during the testing process. Testing for EFT often requires a capacitive coupling clamp (CCL), which is employed to add disturbances to nominal signals.

== See also ==
- IEC 61000-4-2
- IEC 61000-4-5
- Electromagnetic pulse
- Surge protection
- List of common EMC test standards
- List of IEC standards
- List of EN standards
