= 48-volt electrical system =

DC electrical system used in cars

A 48-volt DC electrical system voltage is a relatively low-voltage electrical system that is increasingly used in vehicles. Interest in the concept began in the 2010s as a way to increase the propulsion and battery recharge during regenerative braking for fuel savings in internal combustion engine vehicles, especially mild hybrid vehicles.

== History ==
Traditionally, vehicle low-voltage applications were powered by a 12-volt system. In the 1990s, an attempt by a cross-industry standards group to specify a 42-volt electrical system failed to catch on and was abandoned by 2009. During the 2010s, renewed interest arose for a 48-volt low-voltage standard for powering automotive electronics, especially in hybrid vehicles.

In 2011, German car manufacturers Audi, BMW, Daimler Benz, Porsche, and Volkswagen agreed on a 48 V system supplementing the legacy 12 V low-voltage automotive standard.

In model year 2017, the Renault Scenic dCi Hybrid Assist was the first 48 V mild-hybrid passenger car.

As of 2018, a 48 V electrical subsystem operated production vehicles such as Porsche and Bentley SUVs. Audi and Mercedes-Benz used a 48 V subsystem in 2018 vehicles such as A6, A7, A8 with 3.0 TDI 48 V mild-hybrid, CLS, E-Class, S-Class with M256 3.0 Turbo Otto 48 V Mild-Hybrid.

Hyundai Tucson, Hyundai Santa Fe, Kia Ceed and Kia Sportage followed in model year 2019 with 1.6 and 2.0 turbodiesel engines supported by 48 V mild-hybrid technology.

A European automotive trade association, CLEPA, estimated in 2018 that as many as 1 of every 10 new vehicles in 2025 would use at least one 48-volt device in the vehicle, covering 15 million vehicles per year.

In March 2023, Tesla Inc. revealed that the Tesla Cybertruck and next-generation vehicle would utilize a 48-volt mid-voltage subsystem as a replacement of 12 V system, migrating the low-voltage components with highest power demand to 48 V.

In December 2023, in order to accelerate the adoption by other automakers of 48 V system voltage for automotive components, Tesla offered a "48-volt electrical system whitepaper" to all industry leaders. CEO Jim Farley confirmed that Ford had received a copy and agreed to 'help the supply base move into the 48-volt future". Tesla also adopted 48 volts for its Optimus robot.

== Benefits ==
A 48 V system can provide more power, improve energy recuperation in hybrid systems, allow up to an 85% decrease in cable weight and 85% decrease in hardware cost.

12-volt systems can safely provide only 3.5 kilowatts, while 48 V systems achieve 15 to 20 kW of output, with potential for up to 50 kW. 48 volts is low enough to be considered safe in dry conditions without special protective measures, as it is below the generally accepted 50-volt threshold. (See the article on electrical injury)

One example of where these benefits can be used is in the Gordan Murray Automotive T.50, which uses an integrated starter-generator to power a 48 V air conditioning compressor rather than using a belt. This allows the engine to rev more freely due to the reduced friction, and gives the vehicle consistent AC performance independent of engine RPM. Cars equipped with start-stop systems and using a 48-volt AC compressor will not have HVAC interruptions that belt-driven systems experience while the engine is stopped,

Autonomous driving computer systems use around 2 kilowatts when including redundancy, which would consume the majority of a typical 3.5-kilowatt 12-volt system's available power alone; 48-volt systems would alleviate these power availability concerns.

Another example is with the use of electric turbochargers, active suspension, steer-by-wire and rear-wheel steering systems that have power requirements, and can potentially be more responsive and capable with a 48 V system.

== See also ==
- Automotive battery
- Extra-low voltage
- Load dump
- List of electric vehicle battery manufacturers
