= ISO 7637 =

Electromagnetic compatibility vehicle standard

ISO 7637 Road vehicles -- Electrical disturbances from conduction and coupling is an international electromagnetic compatibility vehicle standard published by the International Organization for Standardization (ISO), that relates to 12- and 24-volt electrical systems. As of November 2018, four parts of ISO 7637 have been published, and one is in development (part 4):

- ISO 7637-1 (last revised October 2015) Definitions and general considerations
- ISO 7637-2 (last revised March 2011) Electrical transient conduction along supply lines only
- ISO 7637-3 (last revised July 2016) Electrical transient transmission by capacitive and inductive coupling via lines other than supply lines
- ISO 7637-4 Electrical transient conduction along shielded high voltage supply lines only
- ISO 7637-5 (last revised November 2016) Enhanced definitions and verification methods for harmonization of pulse generators according to ISO 7637

There are several distinct electrical transient waveforms that are required from this testing to ISO 7637-2. These pulses or waveforms include very high voltage with short rise or fall times often in the nanosecond and microseconds range. These transients are designed to simulate electrical occurrences in operational environments, including a load dump simulation. ISO 7637 is referenced by many vehicle manufacturer standards and individual waveforms are modified to meet specific requirements. ISO 7637 includes both immunity and emissions components of electromagnetic compatibility testing. This standard, including ISO 7637-2, places specific requirements on test equipment that can be used to replicate electrical occurrences.

== See also ==
- List of common EMC test standards
- CISPR
- Electromagnetic interference
