= Electromagnetic compatibility =

Electrical engineering concept

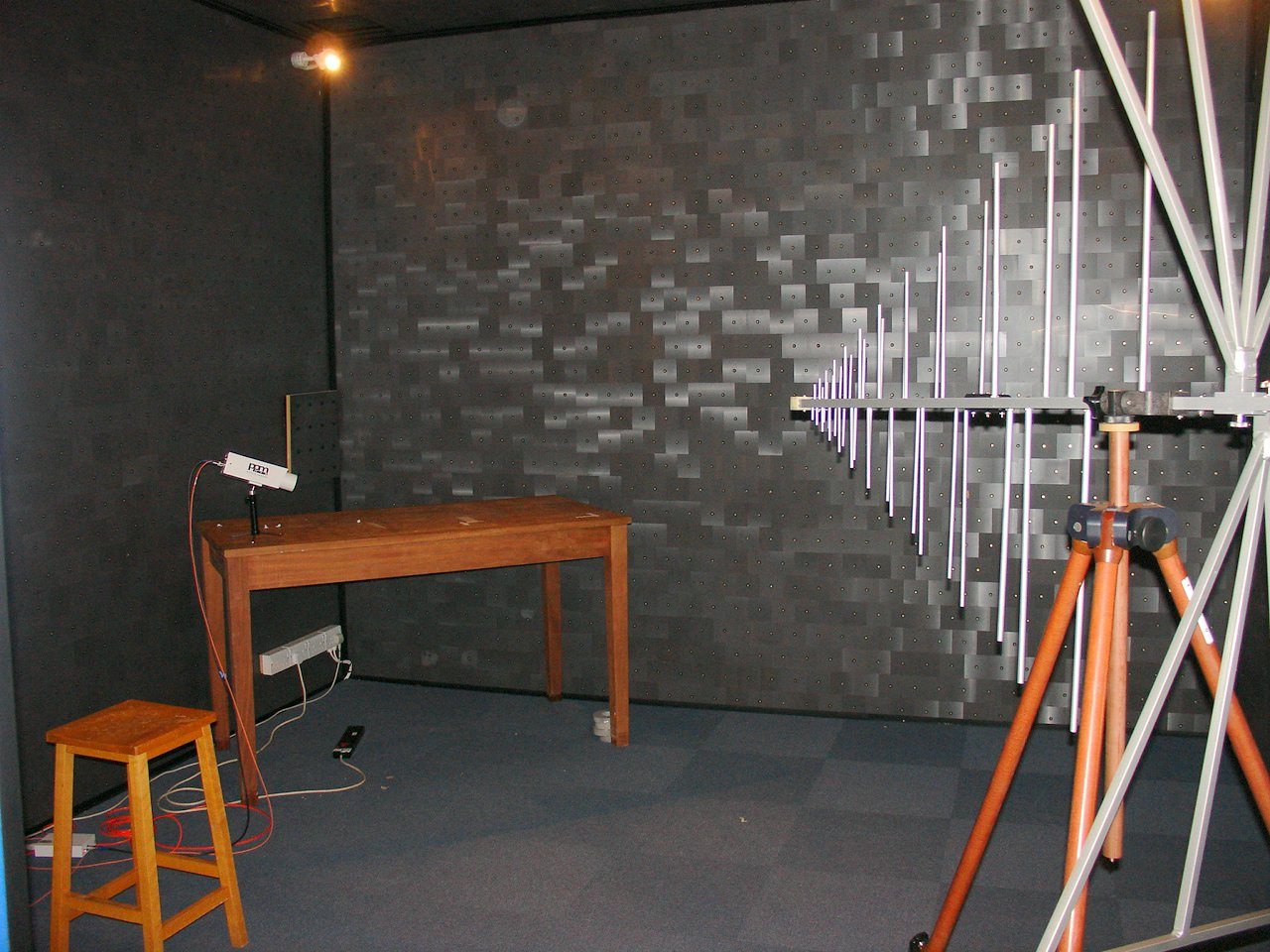
Anechoic RF chamber used for EMC testing (radiated emissions and immunity). The furniture has to be made of wood or plastic, not metal.

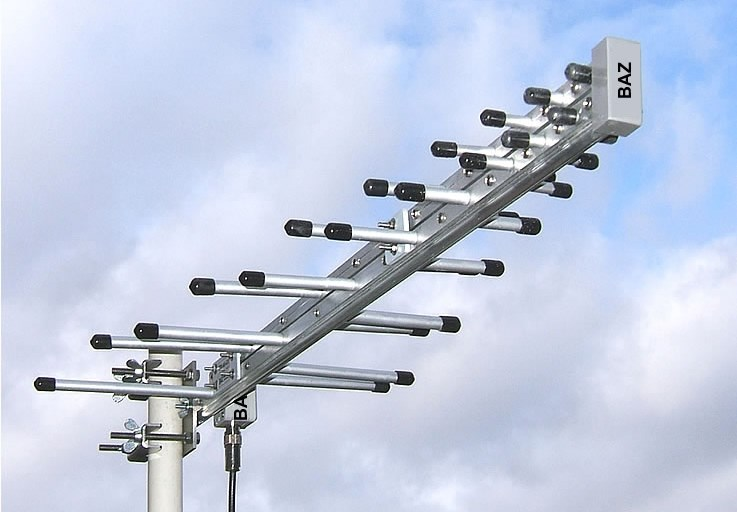
Log-periodic antenna measurement for outdoors

Electromagnetic compatibility (EMC) is the ability of electrical equipment and systems to function acceptably in their electromagnetic environment, by limiting generation, propagation and reception of electromagnetic energy which may cause unwanted effects such as electromagnetic interference (EMI) or even physical damage to operational equipment. The primary goal of EMC is the correct operation of equipment in a common electromagnetic environment.

An EMC engineer, an associated discipline within the electrical engineering, pursues mitigating EMI, resulting in improved electromagnetic compatibility, in products by focusing on three main EMC hazard classes:

- Emission is the generation of electromagnetic energy, whether deliberate or accidental, from a source and its release into the environment. This hazard class can be mitigated by quieting the sources of interference.
- Susceptibility is the tendency of electrical equipment, referred to as the victim, to malfunction or break down in the presence of emissions, also collectively known as radio-frequency interference (RFI). Immunity is the opposite of susceptibility, being the ability of equipment to function correctly in the presence of RFI, with the discipline of "hardening" equipment focusing on reducing susceptibility or immunity.
- Coupling is the mechanism by which emitted interference reaches the victim. This hazard can be mitigated by inhibiting coupling paths.

EMI in practice is typically mitigated by using broad based approaches that may impact all three hazard classes, such as grounding and shielding.

After the unit is built, various EMS test standards may need to be met before entering the unit for sale into a country's market.

== History of Electromagnetic Environment and EMC Susceptibility ==
=== Origins ===
The earliest EMC susceptibility issue was lightning strike (lightning electromagnetic pulse, or LEMP) on ships and buildings. Lightning rods or lightning conductors began to appear in the mid-18th century to carry the energy to ground and reduce damage.

With the advent of widespread electricity generation and power transmission lines from the late 19th century on, lighting strikes to these power lines caused fire and shock hazards to the transmission lines, along with possibly creating short-circuit failure on connected equipment. In the late 19th century, power stations, buildings circuits and even individual appliances were provided with fuses that reduced the potential for damage. Later in the mid-20th century miniature circuit breakers (MCB) would come into popular use to replace fuses for EMC purposes.

=== Early twentieth century ===
Radio interference and the need for mitigation arose with the first spark-gap experiment of Marconi in the late 1800s. As radio communications developed in the first half of the 20th century, interference between multiple broadcast radio signals began to occur and an international regulatory framework was set up by the international telegraph union to ensure interference-free communications.

Switching devices, distributors, relays, etc., became commonplace through the middle of the 20th century, typically in petrol powered cars and motorcycles but also in domestic appliances such as thermostats and refrigerators. This caused transient interference with domestic radio and (after World War II) TV reception, and in due course laws were passed requiring the suppression of such interference sources.

EMI that could cause electrostatic discharge (ESD) problems first arose with accidental electric spark discharges in hazardous environments such as coal mines and when refueling aircraft or motor cars. Safe working practices had to be developed.

=== Postwar period ===
After World War II the military became increasingly concerned with the effects of nuclear electromagnetic pulse (NEMP), lightning strike, and even high-powered radar beams, on vehicle and mobile equipment of all kinds, and especially aircraft electrical systems.

In 1947, when high RF emission levels from other sources became a potential problem (such as with the advent of microwave ovens), certain frequency bands were designated for Industrial, Scientific and Medical (ISM) use, allowing emission levels limited only by thermal heating safety standards. Later, the International Telecommunication Union adopted a Recommendation providing limits of radiation from ISM devices in order to protect radio communications. A variety of issues such as sideband and harmonic emissions, broadband sources, and the ever-increasing popularity of electrical switching devices and their victims, resulted in a steady development of standards and laws.

From the late 1970s, when the popularity of modern digital circuitry technology rapidly grew due to the information age and microelectronics, EMC increasingly became a source of concern due to ever-faster microprocessor switching frequencies over 1 MHz (increasing emissions) and below 5VDC circuit voltages (increasing susceptibility). Many more nations became aware of EMC as a growing problem and issued directives to the manufacturers of digital electronic equipment, which set out the essential manufacturer requirements before their equipment could be marketed or sold. Organizations in individual nations, across Europe and worldwide, were set up to maintain these directives and associated standards. In 1979, the American FCC published a regulation that required the electromagnetic emissions of all "digital devices" to be below certain limits. This regulatory environment led to a sharp growth in the EMC industry supplying specialist devices and equipment, analysis and design software, and testing and certification services. Low-voltage digital circuits, especially CMOS transistors, became more susceptible to ESD damage as they were miniaturised and, despite the development of on-chip hardening techniques, a new ESD regulatory regime had to be developed.

=== Modern era ===
From the 1980s on the explosive growth in mobile communications and broadcast media channels put huge pressure on the available airspace. Regulatory authorities began squeezing band allocations closer and closer together, relying on increasingly sophisticated EMC control methods, especially in the digital communications domain, to keep cross-channel interference to acceptable levels. Digital systems are inherently less susceptible than analogue systems, and also offer far easier ways (such as software) to implement highly sophisticated protection and error-correction measures.

In 1985, the USA released the ISM bands for low-power mobile digital communications, leading to the development of Wi-Fi and remotely-operated car door keys. This approach relies on the intermittent nature of ISM interference and use of sophisticated error-correction methods to ensure lossless reception during the quiet gaps between any bursts of interference.

== Concepts ==
"Electromagnetic interference" (EMI) is defined as the "degradation in the performance of equipment or transmission channel or a system caused by an electromagnetic disturbance" (IEV 161–01–06) while "electromagnetic disturbance" is defined as "an electromagnetic phenomenon that can degrade the performance of a device, equipment or system, or adversely affect living or inert matter (IEV 161-01-05). The terms "electromagnetic disturbance" and "electromagnetic interference" designate respectively the cause and the effect,

Electromagnetic compatibility (EMC) is an equipment characteristic or property and is defined as " the ability of equipment or a system to function satisfactorily in its electromagnetic environment without introducing intolerable electromagnetic disturbances to anything in that environment " (IEV 161–01–07).

EMC ensures the correct operation, in the same electromagnetic environment, of different equipment items which use or respond to electromagnetic phenomena, and the avoidance of any interference. Another way of saying this is that EMC is the control of EMI so that unwanted effects are prevented.

Besides understanding the phenomena in themselves, EMC also addresses the countermeasures, such as control regimes, design and measurement, which should be taken in order to prevent emissions from causing any adverse effect.

== Technical characteristics of interference ==
=== Types of interference ===
EMC is often understood as the control of electromagnetic interference (EMI). Electromagnetic interference divides into several categories according to the source and signal characteristics.

The origin of interference, often called "noise" in this context, can be man-made (artificial) or natural.

Continuous, or continuous wave (CW), interference comprises a given range of frequencies. This type is naturally divided into sub-categories according to frequency range, and as a whole is sometimes referred to as "DC to daylight". One common classification is into narrowband and broadband, according to the spread of the frequency range.

An electromagnetic pulse (EMP), sometimes called a transient disturbance, is a short-duration pulse of energy. This energy is usually broadband by nature, although it often excites a relatively narrow-band damped sine wave response in the victim. Pulse signals divide broadly into isolated and repetitive events.

=== Coupling mechanisms ===
The four EMI coupling modes

When a source emits interference, it follows a route to the victim known as the coupling path. There are four basic coupling mechanisms: conductive, capacitive, magnetic or inductive, and radiative. Any coupling path can be broken down into one or more of these coupling mechanisms working together.

Conductive coupling occurs when the coupling path between the source and victim is formed by direct electrical contact with a conducting body.

Capacitive coupling occurs when a varying electrical field exists between two adjacent conductors, inducing a change in voltage on the receiving conductor.

Inductive coupling or magnetic coupling occurs when a varying magnetic field exists between two parallel conductors, inducing a change in voltage along the receiving conductor.

Radiative coupling or electromagnetic coupling occurs when source and victim are separated by a large distance. Source and victim act as radio antennas: the source emits or radiates an electromagnetic wave which propagates across the space in between and is picked up or received by the victim.

== Control ==
The damaging effects of electromagnetic interference pose unacceptable risks in many areas of technology, and it is necessary to control such interference and reduce the risks to acceptable levels.

The control of electromagnetic interference (EMI) and assurance of EMC comprises a series of related disciplines:

- Characterising the threat.
- Setting standards for emission and susceptibility levels.
- Design for standards compliance.
- Testing for standards compliance.

The risk posed by the threat is usually statistical in nature, so much of the work in threat characterisation and standards setting is based on reducing the probability of disruptive EMI to an acceptable level, rather than its assured elimination.

For a complex or novel piece of equipment, this may require the production of a dedicated EMC control plan summarizing the application of the above and specifying additional documents required.

Characterisation of the problem requires understanding of:

- The interference source and signal.
- The coupling path to the victim.
- The nature of the victim both electrically and in terms of the significance of malfunction.

== Design ==
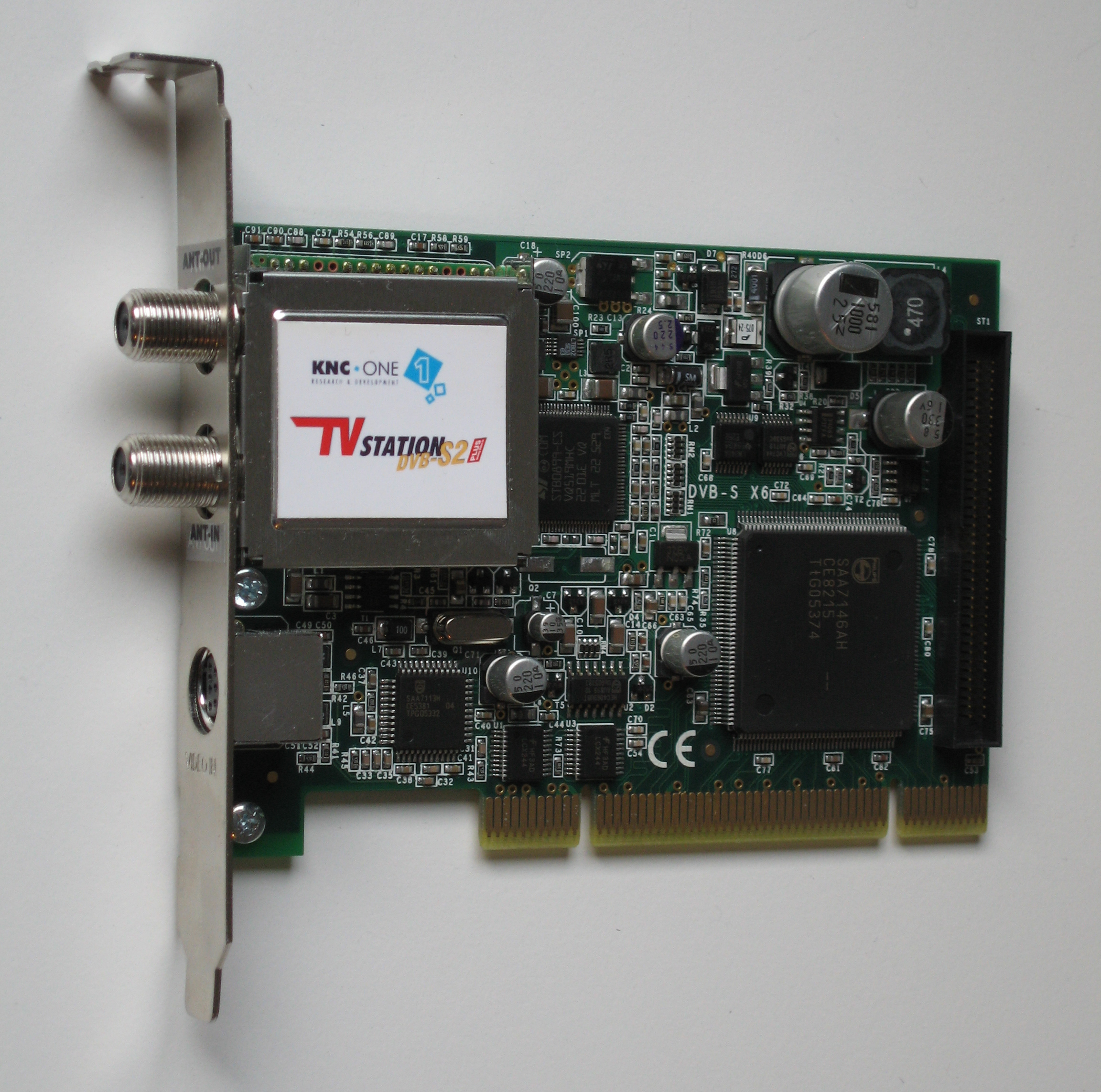
A TV tuner card showing many small bypass capacitors and three metal shields: the PCI bracket, the metal box with two coax inputs, and the shield for the S-Video connector

Breaking a coupling path is equally effective at either the start or the end of the path, therefore many aspects of good EMC design practice apply equally to potential sources and to potential victims. A design which easily couples energy to the outside world will equally easily couple energy in and will be susceptible. A single improvement will often reduce both emissions and susceptibility.

Grounding and shielding aim to reduce emissions or divert EMI away from the victim by providing an alternative, low-impedance path. Techniques include:

- Grounding or earthing schemes such as star earthing for audio equipment or ground planes for RF. The scheme must also satisfy safety regulations.
- Shielded cables, where the signal wires are surrounded by an outer conductive layer that is grounded at one or both ends.
- Shielded housings. A conductive metal housing will act as an interference shield. In order to access the interior, such a housing is typically made in sections (such as a box and lid); an RF gasket may be used at the joints to reduce the amount of interference that leaks through. RF gaskets come in various types. A plain metal gasket may be either braided wire or a flat strip slotted to create many springy "fingers". Where a waterproof seal is required, a flexible elastomeric base may be impregnated with chopped metal fibers dispersed into the interior or long metal fibers covering the surface or both.

Other general measures include:

- Decoupling or filtering at critical points such as cable entries and high-speed switches, using RF chokes and/or RC elements. A line filter implements these measures between a device and a line.
- Transmission line techniques for cables and wiring, such as balanced differential signal and return paths, and impedance matching.
- Avoidance of antenna structures such as loops of circulating current, resonant mechanical structures, unbalanced cable impedances or poorly grounded shielding.
- Eliminating spurious rectifying junctions that can form between metal structures around and near transmitter installations. Such junctions in combination with unintentional antenna structures can radiate harmonics of the transmitter frequency.

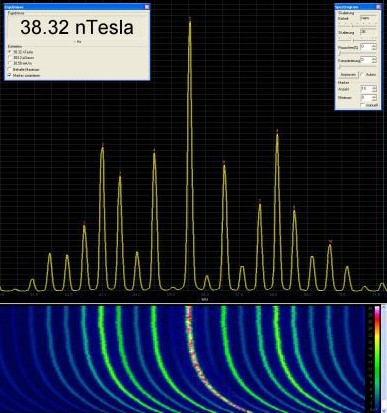
Spread spectrum method reduces EMC peaks. Frequency spectrum of the heating up period of a switching power supply which uses the spread spectrum method incl. waterfall diagram over a few minutes.

Additional measures to reduce emissions include:

- Avoid unnecessary switching operations. Necessary switching should be done as slowly as is technically possible.
- Noisy circuits (e. g. with a lot of switching activity) should be physically separated from the rest of the design.
- High peaks at single frequencies can be avoided by using the spread spectrum method, in which different parts of the circuit emit at different frequencies.
- Harmonic wave filters.
- Design for operation at lower signal levels, reducing the energy available for emission.

Additional measures to reduce susceptibility include:

- Fuses, trip switches and circuit breakers.
- Transient absorbers.
- Design for operation at higher signal levels, reducing the relative noise level in comparison.
- Error-correction techniques in digital circuitry. These may be implemented in hardware, software or a combination of both.
- Differential signaling or other common-mode noise techniques for signal routing

== Testing ==
Testing is required to confirm that a particular device meets the required standards. It is divided broadly into emissions testing and susceptibility testing. Open-area test sites, or OATS, are the reference sites in most standards. They are especially useful for emissions testing of large equipment systems. However, RF testing of a physical prototype is most often carried out indoors, in a specialized EMC test chamber. Types of the chamber include anechoic, reverberation and the gigahertz transverse electromagnetic cell (GTEM cell). Sometimes computational electromagnetics simulations are used to test virtual models. Like all compliance testing, it is important that the test equipment, including the test chamber or site and any software used, be properly calibrated and maintained. Typically, a given run of tests for a particular piece of equipment will require an EMC test plan and a follow-up test report. The full test program may require the production of several such documents.

Emissions are typically measured for radiated field strength and where appropriate for conducted emissions along cables and wiring. Inductive (magnetic) and capacitive (electric) field strengths are near-field effects and are only important if the device under test (DUT) is designed for a location close to other electrical equipment. For conducted emissions, typical transducers include the LISN (line impedance stabilization network) or AMN (artificial mains network) and the RF current clamp. For radiated emission measurement, antennas are used as transducers. Typical antennas specified include dipole, biconical, log-periodic, double ridged guide and conical log-spiral designs. Radiated emissions must be measured in all directions around the DUT. Specialized EMI test receivers or EMI analyzers are used for EMC compliance testing. These incorporate bandwidths and detectors as specified by international EMC standards. An EMI receiver may be based on a spectrum analyser to measure the emission levels of the DUT across a wide band of frequencies (frequency domain), or on a tunable narrower-band device which is swept through the desired frequency range. EMI receivers along with specified transducers can often be used for both conducted and radiated emissions. Pre-selector filters may also be used to reduce the effect of strong out-of-band signals on the front-end of the receiver. Some pulse emissions are more usefully characterized using an oscilloscope to capture the pulse waveform in the time domain.

Radiated field susceptibility testing typically involves a high-powered source of RF or EM energy and a radiating antenna to direct the energy at the potential victim or device under test (DUT). Conducted voltage and current susceptibility testing typically involves a high-powered signal generator, and a current clamp or other type of transformer to inject the test signal. Transient or EMP signals are used to test the immunity of the DUT against powerline disturbances including surges, lightning strikes and switching noise. In motor vehicles, similar tests are performed on battery and signal lines. The transient pulse may be generated digitally and passed through a broadband pulse amplifier, or applied directly to the transducer from a specialized pulse generator. Electrostatic discharge testing is typically performed with a piezo spark generator called an "ESD pistol". Higher energy pulses, such as lightning or nuclear EMP simulations, can require a large current clamp or a large antenna which completely surrounds the DUT. Some antennas are so large that they are located outdoors, and care must be taken not to cause an EMP hazard to the surrounding environment.

== Legislation ==
Compliance with national or international standards is usually laid down by laws passed by individual nations. Different nations can require compliance with different standards depending on the industry or equipment regulations.

=== Organizations ===
Several organizations, both national and international, work to promote international co-operation on standardization (harmonization) of national standards that may be adopted with little or no change between nations, including publishing EMC standards uniquely applicable to various industries and/or individual equipment types. For example, unified, normalised EN standards aim to harmonize national standards of all European Union countries.

International standards organizations with activities and guidance related to EMC include:

- International Electrotechnical Commission (IEC), which has several committees working full-time on EMC issues. These are:
  - Technical Committee 77 (TC77), working on electromagnetic compatibility between equipment including networks.
  - Comité International Spécial des Perturbations Radioélectriques (CISPR), or International Special Committee on Radio Interference.
  - The Advisory Committee on Electromagnetic Compatibility (ACEC) guides and co-ordinates the IEC's work on EMC for the IEC.
- International Telecommuncations Union
- International Organization for Standardization (ISO), which publishes standards for various industries
  - automotive(ISO 11451)
  - earth-moving machinery(ISO 13766)

Example national and multi-national organizations are:

- Europe:
  - Comité Européen de Normalisation (CEN) or European Committee for Standardization/ Comité Européen de Normalisation Electrotechniques (CENELEC) or European Committee for Electrotechnical Standardisation
    - Technical Committee 210.
  - European Telecommunications Standards Institute (ETSI) focusing on radio devices.
- United States:
  - The Federal Communications Commission (FCC).
  - The Society of Automotive Engineers (SAE).
  - The Radio Technical Commission for Aeronautics (RTCA); see DO-160
- Britain: The British Standards Institution (BSI) under GEL/210.
- Germany: The Verband der Elektrotechnik, Elektronik und Informationstechnik (VDE) or Association for Electrical, Electronic and Information Technologies uses lessons learned during EMC testing to improve and publish in partnership with [[Deutsches Institut für Normung|Deutsches Institut für Normung e.V. (DIN)]] or German Institute for Standardisation EMC standards.

=== Europe ===
In European law, EU EMC directive 2014/30/EU (previously 2004/108/EC) defines rules for the placing on the market/putting into service of electric/electronic equipment within the European Union. The Directive applies to a vast range of equipment including electrical and electronic appliances, systems and installations. Manufacturers of electric and electronic devices are advised to run EMC tests in order to comply with compulsory CE-labeling. More are given in the list of EMC directives. Compliance with the applicable harmonised standards whose reference is listed in the OJEU under the EMC Directive gives presumption of conformity with the corresponding essential requirements of the EMC Directive.

=== USA ===
In 2019, the USA adopted a program for the protection of critical infrastructure against an electromagnetic pulse, whether caused by a geomagnetic storm or a high-altitude nuclear weapon.

== See also ==
- Conducted electromagnetic interference
- Crosstalk
- IEEE Electromagnetic Compatibility Society
- International Commission on Non-Ionizing Radiation Protection (ICNIRP)
- List of common EMC test standards
- Television interference
