= 42-volt electrical system =

Automotive wiring, where some implementations run combined 14 V/42 V electrics

In automobiles, a 42-volt electrical system was an electrical power standard proposed in the late 1990s. It was intended to facilitate increasingly-powerful electrically-driven accessories in automobiles, and lighter wiring harnesses. Electric motors were proposed to be used for power steering or other systems, providing more compact installations and eliminating the weight of drive belts or large wires for high-current loads.

The proposed new standard was exactly triple the voltage of existing "12-volt" systems. The higher voltage was selected to provide greater power capacity for wiring and devices on one hand, and to stay under the 50-volt limit used as a guideline for electric shock hazard. The European auto manufacturer Daimler-Benz proposed a 42V brand name for the conversion.

Although many manufacturers were predicting a switch to 36-volt (lithium-ion battery) / 42-volt (charging voltage) electrical systems, the "42V" changeover did not occur by early in the 21st century, and plans were mostly abandoned by 2009. The availability of higher-efficiency motors, new wiring techniques and digital controls, and a focus on hybrid vehicle systems that use high-voltage starter/generators largely eliminated the 2000s cross-industry push for raising the main automotive voltages. Applications that once were thought to require higher voltages, such as electrical power steering, were subsequently achieved with 12-volt systems. In the late 2000s, 42-volt electrical components were used in only a few automotive applications, since incandescent light bulbs work well at 12 volts and switching of a 42-volt circuit is more difficult.

In the 2010s, 48-volt electrical systems became popular.

== History ==
=== USA – Consortium on Advanced Automotive Electrical and Electronic Systems ===
The SAE discussed an increased automobile standard voltage as early as 1988.

In 1994, at the initiative of Daimler-Benz, the first "Workshop on Advanced Architectures for Automotive Electrical Distribution Systems" was held at the Massachusetts Institute of Technology Laboratory for Electromagnetic and Electronic Systems (MIT/LEES) in Cambridge, Massachusetts USA. with the aim of defining the architecture for a future automotive electrical system. From the outset, the participants in this workshop included suppliers as well as the automobile companies Daimler-Benz, Ford and General Motors.

In September 1995, various electrical systems architectures were compared at MIT using the tool "MAESTrO", and in December 1995, in the "Conclusions" of this study, a future voltage level of approximately 40 V was defined.

In early 1996, the "Consortium on Advanced Automotive Electrical and Electronic Systems" was set up. At the ensuing workshop in March 1996, the future nominal voltage of 42 V was confirmed.

In August 1996, IEEE Spectrum published the paper "Automotive electrical systems circa 2005".

On the occasion of the October 1996 Convergence in Detroit, Professor John G. Kassakian (MIT) gave a talk entitled "The Future of Automotive Electrical Systems" as part of the "IEEE Workshop on Automotive Power- Electronics".

On March 24, 1997, Daimler-Benz presented the MIT with a "Draft Specification of a Dual Voltage Vehicle Electrical Power System 42V/14V".

=== Europe ===
At the same time as the activities in the USA, in 1994, again at the initiative of Daimler-Benz, the former SICAN GmbH held its first "Forum Bordnetz" (Vehicle Electrical System Forum) in Hanover for German automobile companies. Here too, suppliers were invited to participate at a very early stage, together with all European vehicle manufacturers.

On February 15, 1996, the introductory paper "Bordnetzarchitektur im Jahr 2005" (Automotive electrical system architecture for the year 2005) was agreed, and on June 4, 1996, BMW presented the "Tabelle heutiger und zukünftiger Verbraucher im Kfz" (Table of present and future loads in the motor vehicle) and the "42V/14V-Bordnetz" (42V/14V PowerNet).

On September 13, 1996, at the 7th International Technical Meeting for Vehicle Electronics in Baden-Baden, considerable interest was raised by the paper "Neue Bordnetz- Architektur und Konsequenzen" (New Automotive Electrical System Architecture and Consequences), presented by Dr. Richard D. Tabors (MIT).

On March 6, 1997, BMW presented the "Spezifikationsentwurf für das Zwei-Spannungsbordnetz 42V/14V" (Draft Specification of a Dual Voltage Vehicle Electrical Power System 42V/14V) in Hanover.

The work at SICAN GmbH was given decisive impetus by the cooperation between BMW and Daimler-Benz, as witnessed in their joint definition of the European "Load List 2005" and the jointly authored "Draft Specification of a Dual Voltage Vehicle Electrical Power System 42V/14V".

Volvo has used 42 V for some of its mild hybrids.

=== 48-volt electrical system ===
The increased adoption of hybrid vehicle technologies in the 2010s led to 48-volt systems being deployed in mild hybrid vehicles, which add electric boost to the typical internal combustion engine (ICE) propulsion, and facilitates some regeneration during braking for fuel savings.

In 2011, several German car makers agreed on a 48 V on-board electric power supply network on top of the current 12 V network and introduced the "Combo plug", a common power plug for DC charging electric vehicles. As of 2018, this 48-volt electrical system had been applied in production vehicles such as Porsche and Bentley SUVs, while Volvo and Audi planned to use the 48-volt standard in 2019 vehicles.

In March 2023, Tesla Inc. began production of the Cybertruck with a 48-volt architecture, the first production vehicle to use 48 volts as the system voltage for the entire low-voltage system. They have indicated that their next-generation vehicle will also be utilizing a 48 V low-voltage electrical system as well.

== Choice of voltage ==
Six-cell lead–acid batteries produce around 12.6 volts while discharging, and their corresponding automotive alternators are designed to produce 13.5 to 14.5 volts during charging. 42 volts is an approximation of the output of the new standard's charging system. The present nominally 12 V automotive electrical system usually operates around 13.8 volts, so 14 V is descriptive. Literature on 42-volt electrical systems often refers to systems powered with a 6-cell lead-acid battery as nominally 14 volts. Depending on operating conditions, the vehicle electrical system voltage today can vary between 6.5 and 16 V, with a varying degree of ripple superimposed on this value.

After extensive preparatory work, resulting in the "List of Loads in the Automobile of the Year 2005", various automotive electrical system architectures were compared using the tool "MAESTrO" (12 V, 12 V/24 V DC, 12 V/48 V DC and 12 V/60 V AC) in the September 1995 workshop at the Massachusetts Institute of Technology (MIT/LEES). The finding of this study was that the highest possible direct voltage was the best alternative.

The limiting factor for direct voltages is a shock-hazard protection limit of 60 V, which must not be exceeded even during voltage fluctuations caused by extreme conditions. This limit eliminates the option of an automotive electrical system with a nominal battery voltage of 48 V, because at low temperatures the charging voltage of the battery can attain 60 V. Also, the price, weight and volume of batteries are influenced by the number of cells, which must therefore be kept to a minimum.

New battery technologies for automotive applications would not have been available at affordable costs for the 42 V/14 V PowerNet. Lead-acid batteries are low-priced and have a very "compliant" charging/discharging characteristic. Therefore, lead-acid batteries would have been used optimised for energy and service life at the lower voltage and optimised for power at the higher voltage.

Another important criterion for a new architecture was that it should allow gradual conversion of loads to the higher voltage system as required.

In a 42 V/14 V system, the 14 V branch should have been freed of higher-power loads and should operate within much narrower limits.

Power electronics is becoming increasingly important in the automotive sphere and will be a decisive factor in the price of future vehicles. This criterion was therefore especially important when selecting the most suitable higher voltage level. Despite the considerable upward trend of power electronics in automotive applications, its share of the market will decline, because growth rates in other market segments are even higher. For that reason alone, a specific manufacturing technology for automotive use is inconceivable.

In intensive discussions with the major semiconductor manufacturers, a voltage of approximately 40 V was found to be advantageous. Many arguments are summarised in the paper "Intelligente Leistungshalbleiter für zukünftige Kfz-Bordnetze" ("Intelligent Power Semiconductors for Future Automotive Electrical Systems") presented by the former Siemens Semiconductors (now Infineon) at the 17th "Elektronik im Kraftfahrzeug" (In-Car Electronics) conference on June 3/4, 1997 in Munich.

Other arguments for a higher voltage included the reduction of weight in the wiring system, improved stability, and reduced voltage drop. With three times the voltage, thick conductors can be reduced to a third of the cross-section, and at the same time the relative voltage drop can also be reduced to a third. For the same cross-section, the relative voltage drop is now no more than one ninth. The voltage level resulting from these arguments was so close to three times the present voltage that 42 V became the automatic choice for the second voltage level.

== See also ==
- Automotive battery
- Extra-low voltage
- Load dump
