= IEC 61000-4-2 =

Immunity standard on electrostatic discharge

IEC 61000-4-2 is the International Electrotechnical Commission's immunity standard on electrostatic discharge (ESD). The publication is one of the basic EMC standards of the IEC 61000–4 series. The European equivalent of the standard is called EN 61000-4-2. The current version of the IEC standard is the second edition dated 2008-12-09. The basic standards (61000-4) are usually called by product or family specific standards, which use these basic standards as a common reference.

== Scope ==
The publication describes requirements, levels and test methods to achieve immunity compliance of an electronic product. The purpose is to create a reproducible ground for product compliance and the standard defines: ranges, levels, test equipment, setups, procedures, calibrations, generator waveforms and general uncertainties. The intention is not to define product specific tests but instead establish a basic common reference. Product specific tests are instead defined in standards such as EN 50130-4 for alarm systems, EN 50121-3-2 for railway applications or IEC 60601-1-2 for medical equipment.

The product, or equipment under test (EUT), is seen from an operator's point of view during test. The EUT is therefore in its operational mode and testing does not include storage or transportation conditions.

== Test levels ==
The EUT is subjected to three types of discharge. Direct contact discharge is preferred either directly to the EUT or indirectly through vertical or horizontal coupling planes. Air discharge is used where direct contact cannot be applied.

ESD Test Levels (IEC/EN 61000-4-2)
	Contact discharge	Air discharge
Level	Test voltage	Test voltage
1	±2 kV	±2 kV
2	±4 kV	±4 kV
3	±6 kV	±8 kV
4	±8 kV	±15 kV
X	Special	Special
X can be any level specified in product specific standards. It can be above, below or between the others.

Note: This table is simplified for the purpose of giving a quick overview. It does not contain the same level of detail as the official IEC 61000-4-2.

== ESD transient ==
The standard describes the output RC-network of the generator as having typical values of 330 Ω and 150 pF. The specified transient rise time (from 10% to 90% of the first peak) is 0.8 ns (±25%). The transient duration is not specified but for waveform verification currents should be measured in 30 ns and 60 ns for each of the test levels.

== See also ==
- Electrostatic discharge
- List of common EMC test standards
- List of IEC standards
- List of EN standards
- Transient voltage suppressor
