= CISPR =

Electromagnetic interference standards body

The Comité International Spécial des Perturbations Radioélectriques (CISPR; English: International Special Committee on Radio Interference) was founded in 1934 to set standards for controlling electromagnetic interference in electrical and electronic devices and is a part of the International Electrotechnical Commission (IEC).

== Organization ==
CISPR is composed of six technical and one management subcommittees, each responsible for a different area, defined as:

- AA - Radio-interference measurements and statistical methods
- B - Interference relating to industrial, scientific, and medical radio-frequency apparatus, to other (heavy) industrial equipment, overhead power lines, high voltage equipment, and electric traction
- D - Electromagnetic disturbances related to electric/electronic equipment on vehicles and internal combustion engine-powered devices
- F - Interference relating to household appliances tools, lighting equipment, and similar apparatus
- H - Limits for the protection of radio frequencies
- I - Electromagnetic compatibility of information technology equipment, multimedia equipment, and receivers
- S - Steering Committee

The IEC describes the structure, officers, work programme, and other relevant details of CISPR on the CISPR Dashboard.

== Technical standards ==
CISPR's standards cover the measurement of radiated and conducted interference and immunity for some products.

CISPR standards include:

- CISPR 11 - Industrial, scientific, and medical equipment - Radio-frequency disturbance characteristics - Limits and methods of measurement
- CISPR 12 - Vehicles, boats, and internal combustion engines - Radio disturbance characteristics - Limits and methods of measurement for the protection of off-board receivers
- CISPR 14-1 - Electromagnetic compatibility - Requirements for household appliances, electric tools, and similar apparatus - Part 1:
- CISPR 14-2 - Electromagnetic compatibility - Requirements for household appliances, electric tools, and similar apparatus - Part 2: Immunity - Product family standard
- CISPR 15 - Limits and methods of measurement of radio disturbance characteristics of electrical lighting and similar equipment
- CISPR 16 - Specification for radio disturbance and immunity measuring apparatus and methods (in multiple parts and sub-parts)
- CISPR 17 - Methods of measurement of the suppression characteristics of passive radio interference filters and suppression components
- CISPR 18-1 - Radio interference characteristics of overhead power lines and high voltage equipment. Part 1: Description of phenomena
- CISPR 18-2 - Radio interference characteristics of overhead power lines and high voltage equipment. Part 2: Methods of measurement and procedures for determining limits
- CISPR 18-3 - Radio interference characteristics of overhead power lines and high-voltage equipment - Part 3: Code of practice for minimizing the generation of radio noise
- CISPR 25 - Vehicles, boats, and internal combustion engines - Radio disturbance characteristics - Limits and methods of measurement for the protection of on-board receivers
- CISPR/TR 28 - Industrial, scientific, and medical equipment (ISM) - Guidelines for emission levels within the bands designated by the ITU
- CISPR/TR 29 - Television broadcast receivers and associated equipment - Immunity characteristics - Methods of objective picture assessment
- CISPR/TR 30-1 - Test method on electromagnetic emissions- Part 1: Electronic control gear for single- and double-capped fluorescent lamps
- CISPR/TR 30-2 - Test method on electromagnetic emissions - Part 2: Electronic control gear for discharge lamps, excluding fluorescent lamps
- CISPR 31 - Database on the characteristics of radio services
- CISPR 32 - Electromagnetic compatibility of multimedia equipment - Emission requirements. This replaced CISPR 13 and CISPR 22.
- CISPR 35 - Electromagnetic compatibility of multimedia equipment - Immunity requirements This will replace CISPR 20 and CISPR 24
- CISPR 36 - Electric and hybrid electric road vehicles - Radio disturbance characteristics - Limits and methods of measurement for the protection of off-board receivers below 30 MHz
- IEC 61000-6-3 - Electromagnetic compatibility (EMC) - Part 6-3: Generic standards - Emission standard for residential, commercial and light-industrial environments
- IEC 61000-6-4 - Electromagnetic compatibility (EMC) - Part 6-4: Generic standards - Emission standard for industrial environments

== Application ==
Depending on the market, CISPR's standards are a benchmark or goal for suppliers to meet OEM requirements or as a product feature. CISPR has prepared a guide for applying its standards which is available on the EMC zone of the IEC website.

CISPR 25 is an increasingly popular benchmark and requirement for body electronics in the automotive electronics market. Electronic suppliers have become increasingly focused on proving that their devices can meet CISPR 25; for example, Texas Instruments has been releasing reference designs that prove one or more devices can meet the standard if used in a design correctly.

== See also ==
- Electromagnetic compatibility
