= List of common EMC test standards =

The following list outlines a number of electromagnetic compatibility (EMC) standards which are known at the time of writing to be either available or have been made available for public comment. These standards attempt to standardize product EMC performance, with respect to conducted or radiated radio interference from electrical or electronic equipment, imposition of other types of disturbance on the mains supply by such equipment, and the sensitivity of such equipment to received interference.

The legal status of these standards varies according to the jurisdiction. Standards called up by the European Union's EMC Directive effectively have the force of law in the EU.

== IEC standards ==
The IEC standards on Electromagnetic compatibility (EMC) are mostly part of the IEC 61000 family. Below are some examples.

- IEC/TR EN 61000-1-1, Electromagnetic compatibility (EMC) - Part 1: General - Section 1: Application and interpretation of fundamental definitions and terms
- IEC/TR EN 61000-2-1, Electromagnetic compatibility (EMC) - Part 2: Environment - Section 1: Description of the environment - Electromagnetic environment for low-frequency conducted disturbances and signaling in public power supply systems
- IEC/TR EN 61000-2-3, Electromagnetic compatibility (EMC) - Part 2: Environment - Section 3: Description of the environment - Radiated and non-network-frequency-related conducted phenomena
- IEC EN 61000-3-2, Electromagnetic compatibility (EMC) - Part 3-2 - Limits - Limits for harmonic current emissions (equipment input current ≤ 16 A per phase)
- IEC EN 61000-3-3, Electromagnetic compatibility (EMC) - Part 3-3 - Limits - Limitation of voltage changes, voltage fluctuations and flicker in public low-voltage supply systems, for equipment with rated current ≤ 16 A per phase and not subject to conditional connection
- IEC EN 61000-3-4, Electromagnetic compatibility (EMC) - Part 3-4: Limits - Limitation of emission of harmonic currents in low-voltage power supply systems for equipment with rated current greater than 16 A (note: for currents > 16 A and ≤ 75 A per phase this standard should be replaced with IEC EN 61000-3-12)
- IEC/TS EN 61000-3-5, Electromagnetic compatibility (EMC) - Part 4-5: Limits - Limitation of voltage fluctuations and flicker in low-voltage power supply systems for equipment with rated current greater than 75 A
- IEC EN 61000-3-11, Electromagnetic compatibility (EMC) - Part 3-11: Limits - Limitation of voltage changes, voltage fluctuations and flicker in public low-voltage supply systems - Equipment with rated current ≤ 75 A and subject to conditional connection
- IEC EN 61000-3-12, Electromagnetic compatibility (EMC) - Part 3-12: Limits - Limits for harmonic currents produced by equipment connected to public low-voltage systems with input current > 16 A and ≤ 75 A per phase
- IEC EN 61000-4-2, Electromagnetic compatibility (EMC)- Part 4-2: Testing and measurement techniques - Electrostatic discharge immunity test
- IEC EN 61000-4-3, Electromagnetic compatibility (EMC)- Part 4-3: Testing and measurement techniques - Radiated, radio-frequency, electromagnetic field immunity test
- IEC EN 61000-4-4, Electromagnetic compatibility (EMC) - Part 4-4: Testing and measurement techniques - Electrical fast transient/burst immunity test
- IEC EN 61000-4-5, Electromagnetic compatibility (EMC) - Part 4-5: Testing and measurement techniques - Surge immunity test
- IEC EN 61000-4-6, Electromagnetic compatibility (EMC) - Part 4-6: Testing and measurement techniques - Immunity to conducted disturbances, induced by radio-frequency fields
- IEC EN 61000-4-7, Electromagnetic compatibility (EMC) - Part 4-7: Testing and measurement techniques - General guide on harmonics and interharmonics measurements and instrumentation, for power supply systems and equipment connected thereto
- IEC EN 61000-4-8, Electromagnetic compatibility (EMC) - Part 4-8: Testing and measurement techniques - Power frequency magnetic field immunity test
- IEC EN 61000-4-9, Electromagnetic compatibility (EMC) - Part 4-9: Testing and measurement techniques - Pulse magnetic field immunity test
- IEC EN 61000-4-11, Electromagnetic compatibility (EMC) - Part 4-11: Testing and measurement techniques - Voltage dips, short interruptions and voltage variations immunity tests
- IEC EN 61000-4-13, Electromagnetic compatibility (EMC) - Part 4-13: Testing and measurement techniques - Harmonics and interharmonics including mains signalling at a.c. power port, low frequency immunity tests
- IEC EN 61000-4-30, Electromagnetic compatibility (EMC) - Part 4-30: Testing and measurement techniques - Power Quality measurement methods
- IEC EN 61000-4-34, Electromagnetic compatibility (EMC) - Part 4-34: Testing and measurement techniques - Voltage dips, short interruptions and voltage variations immunity tests for equipment with mains current more than 16 A per phase
- IEC EN 61000-6-1, Electromagnetic compatibility (EMC) - Part 6-1: Generic standards - Immunity for residential, commercial and light-industrial environments
- IEC EN 61000-6-2, Electromagnetic compatibility (EMC) - Part 6-2: Generic standards - Immunity for industrial environments
- IEC EN 61000-6-3, Electromagnetic compatibility (EMC) - Part 6-3: Generic standards - Emission standard for residential, commercial and light-industrial environments
- IEC EN 61000-6-4, Electromagnetic compatibility (EMC) - Part 6-4: Generic standards - Emission standard for industrial environments
- IEC EN 61000-6-5, Electromagnetic compatibility (EMC) - Part 6-5: Generic standards - Immunity for equipment used in power station and substation environment
- IEC EN 61000-6-6, Electromagnetic compatibility (EMC) - Part 6-6: Generic standards - HEMP immunity for indoor equipment
- IEC EN 61000-6-7, Electromagnetic compatibility (EMC) - Part 6-7: Generic standards - Immunity requirements for equipment intended to perform functions in a safety-related system (functional safety) in industrial locations
- IEC EN 61000-6-8, Electromagnetic compatibility (EMC) - Part 6-8: Generic standards - Emission standard for professional equipment in commercial and light-industrial locations

Medical device EMC example standards are:

- IEC 60601-1-2, Medical electrical equipment - Part 1-2: General requirements for basic safety and essential performance - Collateral Standard: Electromagnetic disturbances - Requirements and tests

== CISPR standards ==
CISPR is the acronym of Comité International Spécial des Perturbations Radio, or the International Special Committee for Radio Protection of IEC. CISPR Standards aim to the protection of radio reception in the range 9 kHz to 400 GHz from interference caused by operation of electrical or electronic appliances and systems in the electromagnetic environment. CISPR standards cover product emission and immunity requirements as well as defining test methods and equipment.

CISPR standards are divided into the following categories:

Basic Standards

They give the general and fundamental conditions or rules for the assessment of EMC and related performance of all products, systems or installations, and serve as reference documents for CISPR Generic and Product (Family) Standards. Basic Standards are general and hence are not dedicated to specific product families or products; they relate to general information, to the disturbing phenomena and to the measurement or testing techniques. They do not contain any prescribed limits or any product/system related performance specifications. However, methods and guidance on how to generate appropriate limits for the protection of radio reception are given.

The following are CISPR Basic EMC Standards:

- CISPR 16-1-1, Specification for radio disturbance and immunity measuring apparatus and methods - Part 1-1: Radio disturbance and immunity measuring apparatus - Measuring apparatus.
- CISPR 16-1-2, Specification for radio disturbance and immunity measuring apparatus and methods - Part 1-2: Radio disturbance and immunity measuring apparatus - Coupling devices for conducted disturbance measurements.
- CISPR 16-1-3, Specification for radio disturbance and immunity measuring apparatus and methods - Part 1-3: Ancillary equipment – Disturbance power.
- CISPR 16-1-4, Specification for radio disturbance and immunity measuring apparatus and methods - Part 1-4: Antennas and test sites for radiated disturbance measurements.
- CISPR 16-1-5, Specification for radio disturbance and immunity measuring apparatus and methods - Part 1-5: Antenna calibration sites & reference test sites for 5 MHz to 18 GHz.
- CISPR 16-1-6, Specification for radio disturbance and immunity measuring apparatus and methods - Part 1-6: EMC antenna calibration.
- CISPR 16-2-1, Specification for radio disturbance and immunity measuring apparatus and methods - Part 2-1: Conducted disturbance measurements.
- CISPR 16-2-2, Specification for radio disturbance and immunity measuring apparatus and methods - Part 2-2: Measurement of disturbance power.
- CISPR 16-2-3, Specification for radio disturbance and immunity measuring apparatus and methods - Part 2-3: Radiated disturbance measurements.
- CISPR 16-2-4, Specification for radio disturbance and immunity measuring apparatus and methods - Part 2-4: Immunity measurements.
- CISPR 16-4-2, Specification for radio disturbance and immunity measurement apparatus and methods - Part 4-2: Measurement instrumentation uncertainty.
- CISPR 17, Methods of measurement of the suppression characteristics of passive EMC filtering devices.
- IEC 61000-4-20, Testing and measurement techniques - Emission and immunity testing in transverse electromagnetic (TEM) waveguides.
- IEC 61000-4-21, Testing and measurement techniques - Reverberation chamber test methods.
- IEC 61000-4-22, Testing and measurement techniques - Radiated emissions and immunity measurements in fully anechoic rooms (FARs).

Generic Standards

Generic EMC Standards are standards related to a particular electromagnetic environment, which specify the set of essential EMC requirements and test procedures, applicable to all the products or systems intended for operation in this environment, provided that no specific EMC Standards for a particular product family, product, system or installation exist. Limits are included, and reference is made to the test procedures given in the relevant Basic Standards.

The following are CISPR Generic EMC Standards:

- IEC 61000-6-1, Electromagnetic compatibility (EMC) - Part 6-1: Generic standards - Immunity for residential, commercial and light-industrial environments
- IEC 61000-6-2, Electromagnetic compatibility (EMC) - Part 6-2: Generic standards - Immunity for industrial environments
- IEC 61000-6-3, Electromagnetic compatibility (EMC) - Part 6-3: Generic standards - Emission standard for equipment in residential environments.
- IEC 61000-6-4, Electromagnetic compatibility (EMC) - Part 6-4: Generic standards - Emission standard for industrial environments.
- IEC 61000-6-5, Electromagnetic compatibility (EMC) - Part 6-5: Generic standards - Immunity for equipment used in power station and substation environment
- IEC 61000-6-6, Electromagnetic compatibility (EMC) - Part 6-6: Generic standards - HEMP immunity for indoor equipment.
- IEC 61000-6-7, Electromagnetic compatibility (EMC) - Part 6-7: Generic standards - Immunity requirements for equipment intended to perform functions in a safety-related system (functional safety) in industrial locations.
- IEC 61000-6-8, Electromagnetic compatibility (EMC) - Part 6-8: Generic standards - Emission standard for professional equipment in commercial and light-industrial locations.

Product (Family) Standards

Product (Family) Standards define specific EMC requirements, test procedures and limits dedicated to particular products, systems or installations for which specific conditions must be considered.

The following are CISPR Product (Family) Standards:

- CISPR 11, Industrial, scientific and medical (ISM) radio-frequency equipment - Radio-frequency disturbance characteristics - Limits and methods of measurement.
- CISPR 12, Vehicles, boats and internal combustion engine driven devices - Radio disturbance characteristics - Limits and methods of measurement for the protection of off-board receivers.
- CISPR 13, Sound and television broadcast receivers and associated equipment - Radio disturbance characteristics - Limits and methods of measurement

(Note: CISPR 13 has been replaced by CISPR 32)

- CISPR 14-1, Electromagnetic compatibility - Requirements for household appliances, electric tools and similar apparatus - Part 1: Emission.
- CISPR 14-2, Electromagnetic compatibility - Requirements for household appliances, electric tools and similar apparatus - Part 2: Immunity - Product family standard.
- CISPR 15, Limits and methods of measurement of radio disturbance characteristics of electrical lighting and similar equipment.
- CISPR 20, Sound and television broadcast receivers and associated equipment - Immunity characteristics - Limits and methods of measurement

(Note: CISPR 20 has been replaced by CISPR 35)

- CISPR 22, Information technology equipment - Radio disturbance characteristics - Limits and methods of measurement

(Note: CISPR 22 has been replaced by CISPR 32)

- CISPR 24, Information technology equipment - Immunity characteristics - Limits and methods of measurement

(Note: CISPR 24 has been replaced by CISPR 35)

- CISPR 25, Vehicles, boats and internal combustion engine driven devices - Radio disturbance characteristics - Limits and methods of measurement for the protection of on-board receivers.
- CISPR 32, Electromagnetic Compatibility of multimedia equipment – Emission requirements.
- CISPR 35, Electromagnetic Compatibility of multimedia equipment – Immunity requirements.
- CISPR 36, Electric and hybrid electric road vehicles - Radio disturbance characteristics - Limits and methods of measurement for the protection of off-board receivers below 30 MHz.

In the CISPR Guide, March 2021 there is a non-exhaustive selection list of products and the appropriate CISPR standards to be applied.

== ISO standards ==
The following are ISO standards on automotive EMC issues.

- ISO 7637, Road vehicles - Electrical disturbances from conduction and coupling
- ISO 11451-1, Road vehicles - Vehicle test methods for electrical disturbances from narrowband radiated electromagnetic energy - Part 1: General and definitions
- ISO 11451-2, Road vehicles - Vehicle test methods for electrical disturbances from narrowband radiated electromagnetic energy - Part 2: Off-vehicle radiation source
- ISO 11451-3, Road vehicles - Vehicle test methods for electrical disturbances from narrowband radiated electromagnetic energy - Part 3: On-board transmitter simulation
- ISO 11451-4, Road vehicles - Vehicle test methods for electrical disturbances from narrowband radiated electromagnetic energy - Part 4: Harness excitation methods
- ISO 11451-5, Road vehicles - Vehicle test methods for electrical disturbances from narrowband radiated electromagnetic energy - Part 4: Reverberation chamber
- ISO 11452-1, Road vehicles - Component test methods for electrical disturbances from narrowband radiated electromagnetic energy - Part 1: General principles and terminology
- ISO 11452-2, Road Vehicles - Component test methods for electrical disturbances from narrowband radiated electromagnetic energy - Part 2: Absorber lined shielded technology
- ISO 11452-3, Road Vehicles - Component test methods for electrical disturbances from narrowband radiated electromagnetic energy - Part 2: Transverse electromagnetic (TEM) cell
- ISO 11452-4, Road Vehicles - Component test methods for electrical disturbances from narrowband radiated electromagnetic energy - Part 4: Harness excitation methods
- ISO 11452-5, Road Vehicles - Component test methods for electrical disturbances from narrowband radiated electromagnetic energy - Part 5: Stripline
- ~~ISO 11452-6, Road Vehicles - Component test methods for electrical disturbances from narrowband radiated electromagnetic energy - Part 6: Parallel plate antenna~~ WITHDRAWN
- ISO 11452-7, Road Vehicles - Component test methods for electrical disturbances from narrowband radiated electromagnetic energy - Part 7: Direct radio frequency (RF) power injection
- ISO 11452-8, Road Vehicles - Component test methods for electrical disturbances from narrowband radiated electromagnetic energy - Part 8: Immunity to magnetic fields
- ISO 11452-9, Road Vehicles - Component test methods for electrical disturbances from narrowband radiated electromagnetic energy - Part 9: Portable transmitters
- ISO 11452-10, Road Vehicles - Component test methods for electrical disturbances from narrowband radiated electromagnetic energy - Part 10: Immunity to conducted disturbances in the extended audio frequency range
- ISO 11452, Road vehicles - Electrical disturbances by narrowband radiated electromagnetic energy - Component test methods
- ISO 13766-1, Earthmoving Machinery - Electromagnetic Compatibility - Part 1: General EMC requirements under typical electromagnetic environmental conditions
- ISO 13766-2, Earthmoving Machinery - Electromagnetic Compatibility - Part 2: Additional EMC requirements for functional safety
- ISO 14982, Agricultural and forestry machinery—Electromagnetic compatibility—Test methods and acceptance criteria

== SAE Electromagnetic Compatibility (EMC) Standards committee ==
- J1113/1, Electromagnetic Compatibility Measurement Procedures and Limits for Components of Vehicles, Boats (up to 15 m), and Machines (Except Aircraft) (16.6 Hz to 18 GHz)
- J1113/11, Immunity to Conducted Transients on Power Leads
- J1113/12, Electrical Interference by Conduction and Coupling—Capacitive and Inductive Coupling via Lines Other than Supply Lines
- J1113/13, Electromagnetic Compatibility Measurement Procedure for Vehicle Components—Part 13: Immunity to Electrostatic Discharge
- J1113/21, Electromagnetic Compatibility Measurement Procedure for Vehicle Components—Part 21: Immunity to Electromagnetic Fields, 30 MHz to 18 GHz, Absorber-Lined Chamber
- J1113/26, Electromagnetic Compatibility Measurement Procedure for Vehicle Components—Immunity to AC Power Line Electric Fields
- J1113/27, Electromagnetic Compatibility Measurements Procedure for Vehicle Components—Part 27: Immunity to Radiated Electromagnetic Fields—Mode Stir Reverberation Method
- J1113/4, Immunity to Radiated Electromagnetic Fields—Bulk Current Injection (BCI) Method
- J1752/1, Electromagnetic Compatibility Measurement Procedures for Integrated Circuits - Integrated Circuit EMC Measurement Procedures—General and Definitions
- J1752/2, Measurement of Radiated Emissions from Integrated Circuits—Surface Scan Method (Loop Probe Method) 10 MHz to 3 GHz
- J1752/3, Measurement of Radiated Emissions from Integrated Circuits—TEM/Wideband TEM (GTEM) Cell Method; TEM Cell (150 kHz to 1 GHz), Wideband TEM Cell (150 kHz to 8 GHz)
- J1812, Function Performance Status Classification for EMC Immunity Testing
- J2556, Radiated Emissions (RE) Narrowband Data Analysis—Power Spectral Density (PSD)
- J2628, Characterization—Conducted Immunity
- J551/1, Performance Levels and Methods of Measurement of Electromagnetic Compatibility of Vehicles, Boats (up to 15 m), & Machines (16.6 Hz to 18 GHz)
- J551/15, Vehicle Electromagnetic Immunity—Electrostatic Discharge (ESD)
- J551/16, Electromagnetic Immunity—Off-Vehicle Source (Reverberation Chamber Method)—Part 16: Immunity to Radiated Electromagnetic Fields
- J551/17, Vehicle Electromagnetic Immunity—Power Line Magnetic Fields
- J551/5, Performance Levels and Methods of Measurement of Magnetic and Electric Field Strength from Electric Vehicles, Broadband, 9 kHz To 30 MHz

== European standards concerning unwanted electrical emissions ==
- EN 50 081 part1 European Generic emission standard, part1: Domestic, commercial and light industry environment, replaced by EN61000-6-3
- EN 50 081 part2 European Generic emission standard, part2: industrial environment, replaced by EN61000-6-4
- EN 55 011 European limits and methods of measurement of radio disturbance characteristics for scientific and medical equipment
- EN 55 013 European limits and methods of measurement of radio disturbance characteristics of broadcast receivers
- EN 55 014 European limits and methods of measurement of radio disturbance characteristics of household appliances and power tools, replaced by EN55014-1, and immunity part is covered by EN55014-2
- EN 55 015 European limits and methods of measurement of radio disturbance characteristics of fluorescent lamps
- EN 55 022 European limits and methods of measurement of radio disturbance characteristics of information technology equipment
- EN 55 032 Electromagnetic compatibility of multimedia equipment - Emission requirements
- EN 60 555 part 2 and 3 Disturbances of power supply network (part 2) and power fluctuations (part 3) caused by of household appliances and power tools, replaced by EN61000-3-2 and EN61000-3-3
- EN 13309 Construction Machinery - Electromagnetic compatibility of machines with internal electrical power supplies
- VDE 0875 German EMC directive for broadband interference generated by household appliances
- VDE 0871 German EMC directive for broadband and narrowband interference generated by information technology equipment

== European standards concerning immunity to electrical emissions ==
- EN 50 082 part1 European immunity standard, part1: Domestic, commercial and light industry environment, replaced by EN61000-6-1
- EN 50 082 part2 European immunity standard, part2: industrial environment, replaced by EN61000-6-2
- EN 50 093 European, immunity to short dips in the power supply (brownouts)
- EN 55 020 European, immunity from radio interference of broadcast receivers
- EN 55 024 European immunity requirements for information technology equipment
- EN 55 101 older draft of immunity requirements for information technology equipment, replaced by EN 55 024
- EN 50 081 part1 European Generic emission standard, part1: Domestic, commercial and light industry environment, replaced by EN61000-6-3
- EN 50 081 part2 European immunity requirements for information technology equipment, replaced by EN61000-6-4

== American standards ==
- FCC Part 15 regulates unlicensed radio-frequency transmissions, both intentional and unintentional.
  - FCC Part 15 Subpart A contains a general provision that "devices may not cause interference and must accept interference from other sources."
  - FCC Part 15 Subpart B US limits and methods of measurement of radio disturbance, measuring radio waves accidentally emitted from devices not specifically designed to emit radio waves ("unintentional"), both directly ("radiated") and indirectly ("conducted")
  - The rest of FCC Part 15 (subparts C through H) deal with unlicensed devices specifically designed to emit radio waves ("intentional"), such as wireless LAN, cordless telephones, low-power broadcasting, walkie-talkies, etc.
  - Conducted emissions are regulated from 150 kHz to 30 MHz, and radiated emissions are regulated from 30 MHz and up.
- MIL-STD 461 is a US Military Standard addressing EMC for subsystem and components. Currently in revision G, it covers Conducted and Radiated Emissions and Susceptibility.
- MIL-STD 464 is a US Military Standard addressing EMC for systems. Currently in revision D, it covers E3 interface requirements and verification criteria of military platforms.
- MIL-STD-469, MILITARY STANDARD:This standard establishes the engineering interface requirements to control the electromagnetic emission and susceptibility characteristics of all new military radar equipment and systems operating between 100 megahertz (MHz) and 100 gigahertz (GHz).
- RTCA DO-160: This standard established EMC for the aerospace industry and such electrical devices: avionics, landing gear, actuators, alternators, etc.

== ITU Standards ==
- ITU-T K.58 Electromagnetic compatibility, resistibility and safety requirements and guidance for determining responsibility in co-located information and communication technology installations
