= Load dump =

Disconnection of a powered load, in automotive contexts

Load dump means the disconnection of a powered load. It can cause two problems:

- failure of supply to equipment or customers
- large voltage spikes from the inductive generator(s)

In automotive electronics, it refers to the disconnection of the vehicle battery from the alternator while the battery is being charged. Due to such a disconnection of the battery, other loads connected to the alternator experience a surge in the voltage on the battery bus. This surge may be as high as 120 volts and the surge may take up to 400 ms to decay. It is typically clamped to 40 V in 12 V vehicles and about 60 V in 24 V systems.

== Overview ==
The field winding of an alternator has a large inductance. When the vehicle battery is being charged, the alternator generates a large current, the magnitude of which is controlled by the current in the field winding. If the battery becomes disconnected while it is being charged the load on the alternator suddenly decreases. However, the vehicle's voltage regulator cannot quickly cause the field current to decrease sufficiently, so the alternator continues to generate a large current. This large current causes the voltage on the vehicle bus to increase significantly—well above the normal and regulated level.

All the loads connected to the alternator see this high voltage spike. The strength of the spike depends on many factors including the speed at which the alternator is rotating and the current which was being supplied to the battery before it was disconnected. These spike may peak at as high as 120 V and may take up to 400 ms to decay. This kind of a spike would damage many semiconductor devices, e.g. ECUs, that may be connected to the alternator. Special protection devices, such as TVS diodes, varistors which can withstand and absorb the energy of these spikes may be added to protect such semiconductor devices.

Various automotive standards such as ISO 7637-2 and SAE J1113-11 specify a standard shape of the load dump pulse against which automotive electronic components may be designed.

There can also be a smaller inductive spike due to the inductance of the stator windings. That may have a larger voltage, but it will be for a much shorter duration, as relatively little energy is stored in the inductance of these windings. Load dump can be more damaging because the alternator continues to generate power until the field current can decrease, so much more energy can be released.
