= Random pulse-width modulation =

Modulation technique for mitigating EMI of power converters

Random pulse-width modulation (RPWM) is a modulation technique introduced for mitigating electromagnetic interference (EMI) of power converters by spreading the energy of the noise signal over a wider bandwidth, so that there are no significant peaks of the noise. This is achieved by randomly varying the main parameters of the pulse-width modulation signal.

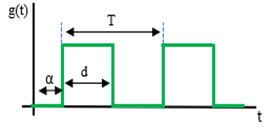
Main parameters of PWM signal

== Description ==
Electromagnetic interference (EMI) filters have been widely used for filtering out the conducted emissions generated by power converters since their advent. However, when size is of great concern like in aircraft and automobile applications, one of the practical solutions to suppress conducted emissions is to use random pulse-width modulation (RPWM). In conventional pulse-width modulation (PWM) schemes, the harmonics power is concentrated on the deterministic or known frequencies with a significant magnitude, which leads to mechanical vibration, noise, and EMI. However, by applying randomness to the conventional PWM scheme, the harmonic power will spread out so that no harmonic of significant magnitude exists, and peak harmonics at discrete frequency are significantly reduced.

In RPWM, one of the switching parameters of the PWM signal, such as switching frequency, pulse position and duty cycle are varied randomly in order to spread the energy of the PWM signal. Hence, depending on the parameter which is made random, RPWM can be classified as random frequency modulation (RFM), random pulse-position modulation (RPPM) and random duty-cycle modulation (RDCM).

The properties of RPWM can be investigated further by looking at the power spectral density (PSD). For conventional PWM, the PSD can be directly determined from the Fourier Series expansion of the PWM signal. However, the PSD of the RPWM signals can be described only by a probabilistic level using the theory of stochastic processes such as wide-sense stationary (WSS) random processes.

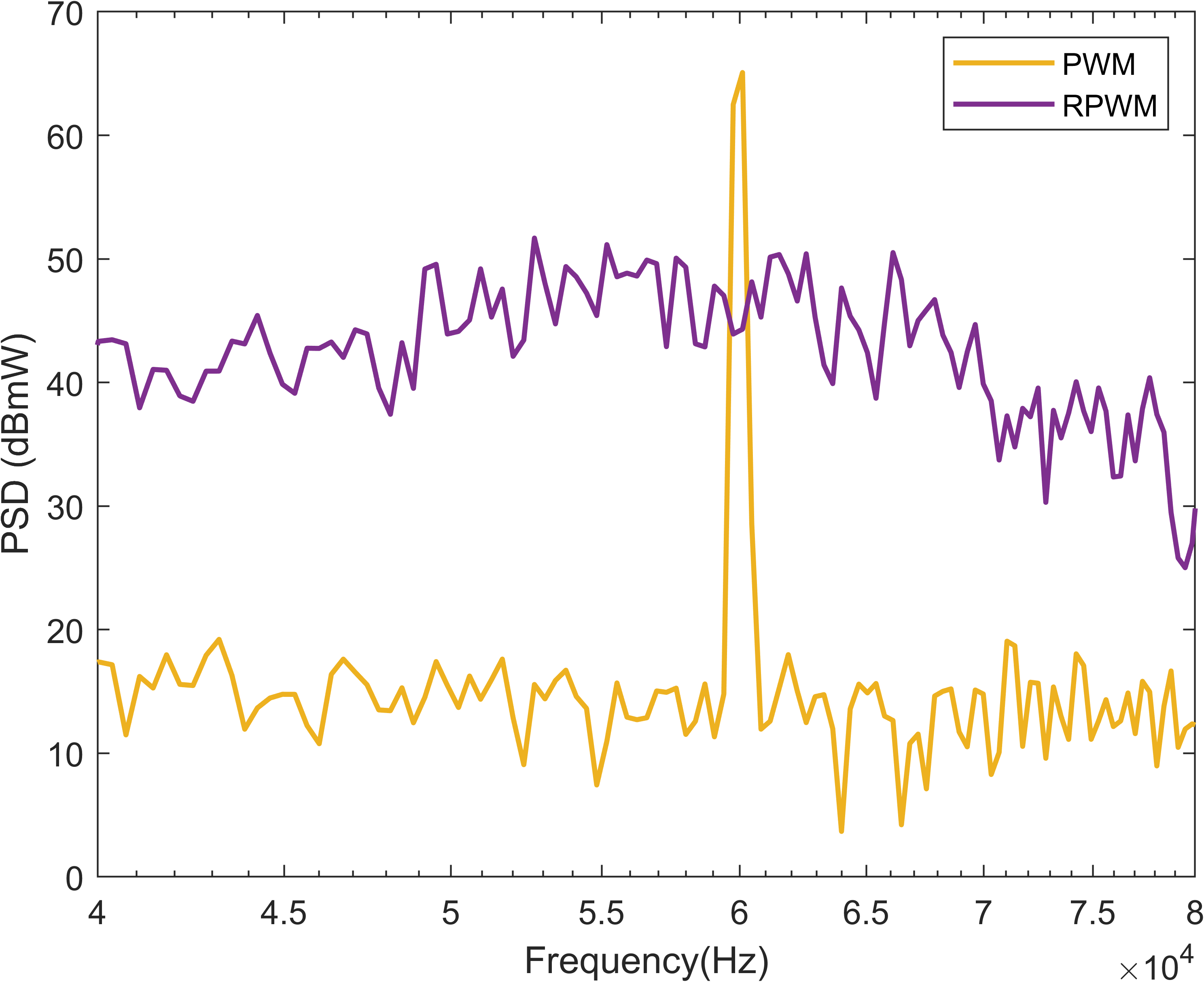
Comparison of the PSD of PWM vs RPWM signals

=== RFM ===
Among the different RPWM techniques, RFM (random frequency modulation) is the most common method of the three major types, used in many power converter topologies to pass the electromagnetic compatibility (EMC) test. In this type of modulation, the switching frequency of the PWM signal is varied randomly in order to spread the emitted noise of the power converters in which it is applied. RFM is very easy to implement and it offers significant reduction of the noise peaks compared to conventional PWM. However, application is limited to power converters which does not require fixed switching frequency for their normal operation. A greater degree of switching frequency variation can affect the proper functioning of the devices and components inside the power converter circuit.

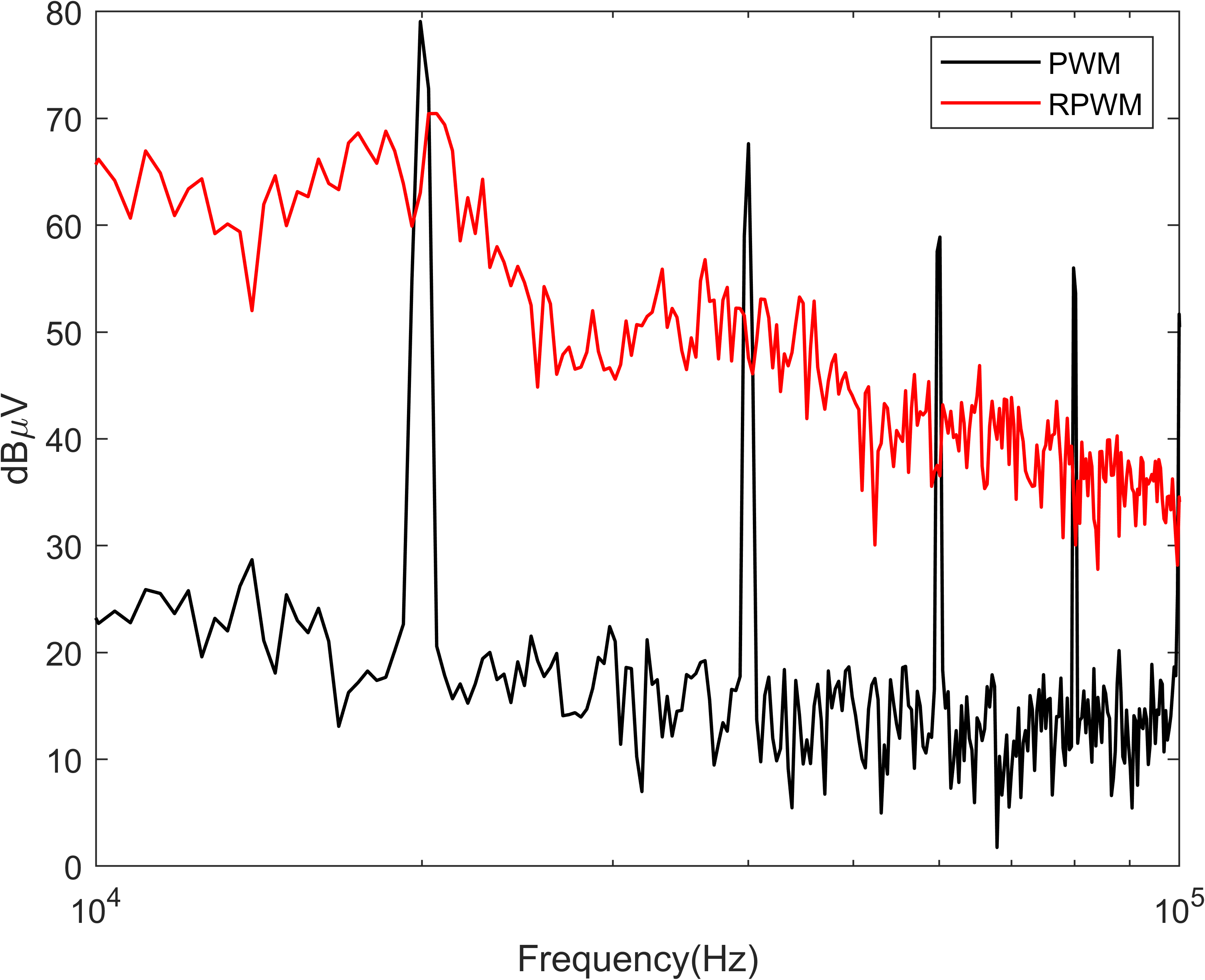
Comparison of the output voltage harmonics of a DC-DC converter where different modulation is resorted

=== RPPM ===
RPPM is also commonly deployed in power converters to pass the EMC compliance tests. This modulation technique also offers significant reduction of the conducted emission and, consequentially, the radiated emission of power converters. However, compared to RFM, RPPM is less effective in EMI reduction. This is because the PSD of RPPM contains both the density and harmonic components, and the spectrum cannot be fully spread unlike that of RFM where the spectrum has only the density component. However, in this modulation scheme, both the switching frequency and the pulse width are fixed so that the converter components like inductors and capacitors can function properly.

=== RDCM ===
In RDCM, the pulse width or the duty cycle of the PWM signal is varied randomly in order to spread the noise spectrum. This kind of modulation is less common compared to the previous ones. This is because RDCM is less effective at spreading the noise. Moreover, randomly varying the duty cycle may cause output voltage fluctuations and ripples. Besides, in some power converter topologies, the duty cycle variation is the primary means of controlling the input-output voltages and currents using closed loop control systems. An example of this could be the drive for a brushed DC motor. Since the power to the motor is already being "chopped" at a specific frequency to vary the voltage and current, introducing randomization into the process could cause detriments to the system's performance.

=== In variable-frequency inverter systems ===
This type of modulation is becoming more common in variable-frequency drives of all sizes and applications. in consumer-sized VFDs that include it as a feature, it presents as a user-selectable parameter, often with several different operating levels. Some drives may also use more than one method at once. However, while the term "RPWM" is generally used to label this type of modulation in a technical sense, the technology does not yet have a label in the world of VFD parameter names. For example, Fuji Electric labels its noise-reduction parameter as "motor tone", while both Mitsubishi Electric and Teco Westinghouse label it as "soft PWM". The use of the term "soft PWM" could potentially cause confusion to those not familiar with this technique, as zero crossing control is sometimes labeled as "soft switching".

A term that could be potentially used as a standard label could be "scrambled PWM" or "carrier scrambling", as the word "scramble" in this sense is nonspecific to the method of RPWM used, yet informs the user that there is indeed a specialized process occurring which affects the shape and properties of the output waveform. In addition, the word has a home in the telecommunications field, where a scrambler is any device (typically analog) that is used to encode a signal so that it will be unintelligible if intercepted before it can reach the intended recipient without an appropriately tuned de-scrambler. That is to say that "scramble" would not be out of place if used to label RPWM in a more general sense.

Regardless of the label, upon observation of the manual in consumer-sized VFDs that include it, the focus of the parameter description does appear to be on acoustic noise reduction, rather than EMI reduction and motor health.

In modern rail traction converters, this method presents in a change in the sound that the motors emit when driven by inverters which utilize it. As opposed to the normally steady, carrier-based whine of a classic SPWM convertor, the sound is more of a hiss, akin to white noise. Because rail traction convertors operate at such high power levels, EMI is more readily created in such systems. In these applications RPWM is highly beneficial to the motor's health and the level of emitted EMI.

== Coexistence issue ==
RPWM techniques are very effective in reducing the EMI of power converters. However, when power converters with this special type of modulation coexist with communication systems, there may be a severe electromagnetic interference conflict between the power system and the communication system. This detrimental effect can be observed in power line communication (PLC) systems, where both power converters and communication systems coexist. Indeed, recent studies have confirmed that RPWM applied to power converters to minimize conducted emissions can detrimentally interfere with the PLC system.

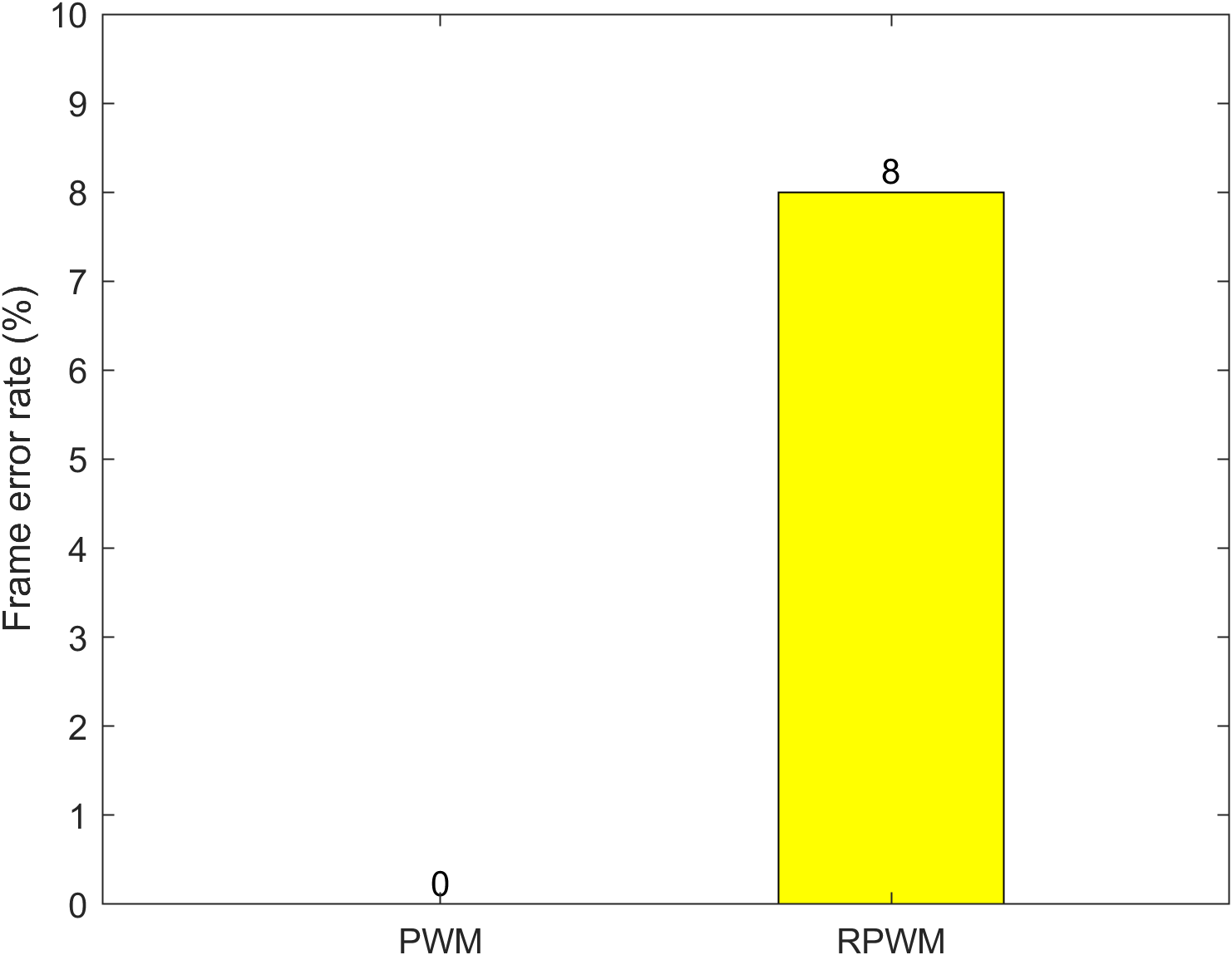
Frame error rate of G3-PLC coexist with DC-DC converter modulated with both PWM and RPWM

The interference can be worsened when the switching frequency and the bandwidth of the PLC system overlaps with that of the power system. Most power converters use a switching frequency that is below 150 kHz, which is in the low frequency electromagnetic compatibility range. This could cause coexistence issues mainly in narrow band PLC systems, (specialized PLC protocols which are being used for smart grid application, such as Prime PLC and G3-PLC, in frequencies below 150 kHz.) In conventional PWM, the noise from power converter overlaps with the PLC frequency band at discrete multiples of the switching frequency only. This results in less interference to the PLC system. However, In RPWM, the noise is more evenly distributed and both the PLC and the noise from power converter shares wider bandwidth. This creates more disturbance to the PLC system. Therefore, it is advisable to carefully observe the properties of any coexisting systems in order to choose a switching frequency for randomly modulated power converters that does not overlap with that of a coexisting PLC system.

== See also ==
- Conducted emissions
- Electromagnetic compatibility
- Electromagnetic interference
- Power-line communication
- Spread spectrum
