= Pulse width =

Time between start and end of a pulse

t_{1} indicates pulse width.

The pulse width is a measure of the elapsed time between the leading and trailing edges of a single pulse of energy. The measure is typically used with electrical signals and is widely used in the fields of radar and power supplies. There are two closely related measures. The pulse repetition interval measures the time between the leading edges of two pulses but is normally expressed as the pulse repetition frequency (PRF), the number of pulses in a given time, typically a second. The duty cycle expresses the pulse width as a fraction or percentage of one complete cycle.

In the physical reality, the edge of tghe pulse is not vertical, so the pulse width is measured at some percentage of the maximum amplitude. At the typical 50% level, the meaurements is called PW50, also known as full width at half maximum (FWHM).

Pulse width is an important measure in radar systems. Radars transmit pulses of radio frequency energy out of an antenna and then listen for their reflection off of target objects. The amount of energy that is returned to the radar receiver is a function of the peak energy of the pulse, the pulse width, and the pulse repetition frequency. Increasing the pulse width increases the amount of energy reflected off the target and thereby increases the range at which an object can be detected. Radars measure range based on the time between transmission and reception, and the resolution of that measurement is a function of the length of the received pulse. This leads to the basic outcome that increasing the pulse width allows the radar to detect objects at longer range but at the cost of decreasing the accuracy of that range measurement. This can be addressed by encoding the pulse with additional information, as is the case in pulse compression systems.

In modern switched-mode power supplies, the voltage of the output electrical power is controlled by rapidly switching a fixed-voltage source on and off and then smoothing the resulting stepped waveform. Increasing the pulse width increases the output power. This allows complex output waveforms to be constructed by rapidly changing the pulse width to produce the desired signal, a concept known as pulse-width modulation.

== Sources ==
- "How To Measure Pulse Width & Duty Cycle" (PDF). Archived from the original (PDF) on 2022-07-01.
- Guarisco, Davide; Li, Zhaohui; Higgins, Bill E.; Saito, Kaz; Wu, Yan; LeFebvre, Andrew (2006). "Drive integration in perpendicular recording (invited)" (PDF). Journal of Applied Physics. 99 (8): 08Q908. doi:10.1063/1.2175821.
- "SFR results: Edge and MTF (Sharpness) plot". Imatest.
