= Sample and hold =

Type of voltage sampling device

A simplified sample and hold circuit diagram. AI is an analog input, AO — an analog output, C — a control signal.

Sample times.

Sample and hold.

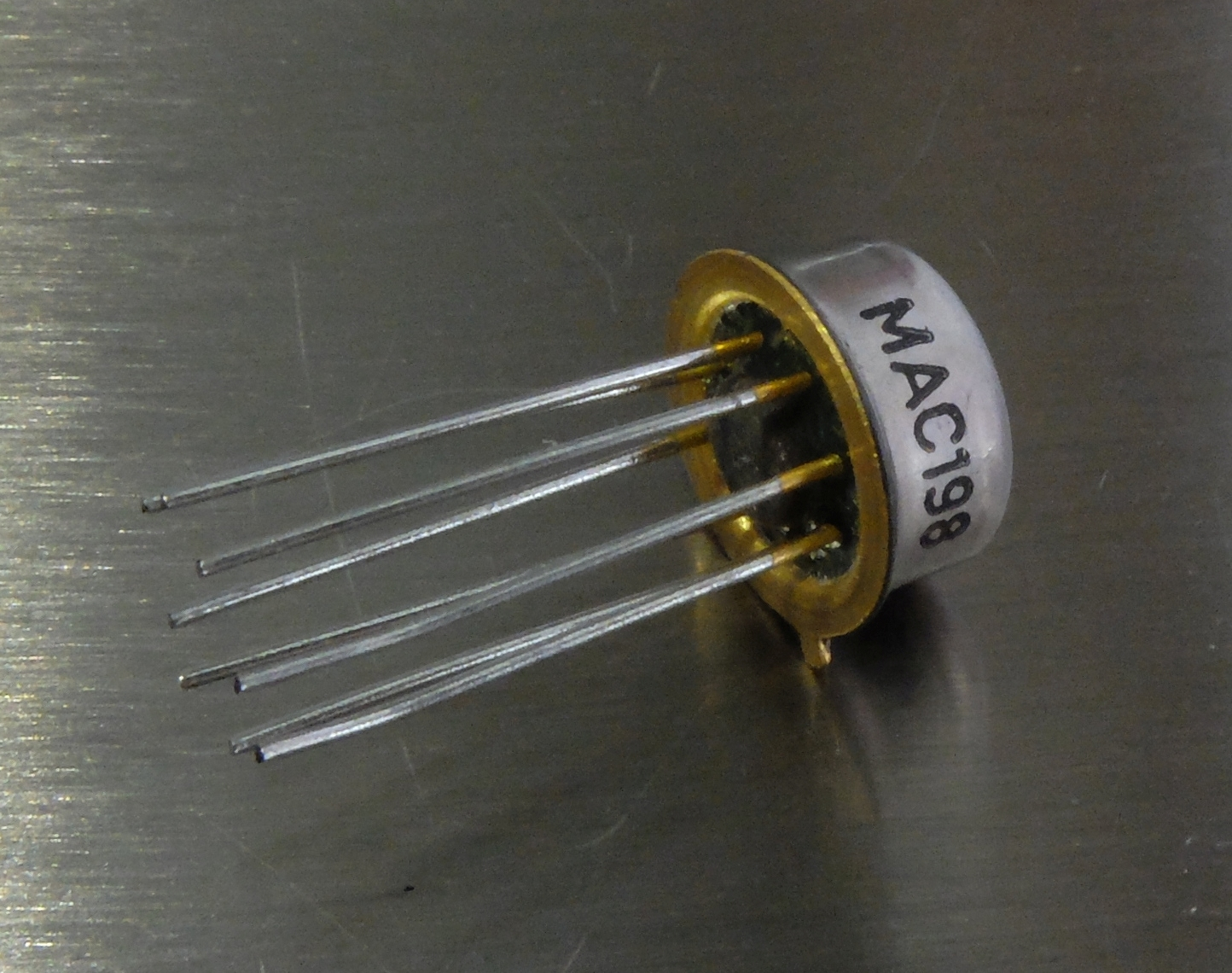
A sample-and-hold integrated circuit (Tesla MAC198)

In electronics, a sample and hold (also known as sample and follow) circuit is an analog device that samples (captures, takes) the voltage of a continuously varying analog signal and holds (locks, freezes) its value at a constant level for a specified minimum period of time. Sample and hold circuits and related peak detectors are the elementary analog memory devices. They are typically used in analog-to-digital converters to eliminate variations in input signal that can corrupt the conversion process. They are also used in electronic music, for instance to impart a random quality to successively-played notes.

A typical sample and hold circuit stores electric charge in a capacitor and contains at least one switching device such as a FET (field effect transistor) switch and normally one operational amplifier. To sample the input signal, the switch connects the capacitor to the output of a buffer amplifier. The buffer amplifier charges or discharges the capacitor so that the voltage across the capacitor is practically equal, or proportional to, input voltage. In hold mode, the switch disconnects the capacitor from the buffer. The capacitor is invariably discharged by its own leakage currents and useful load currents, which makes the circuit inherently volatile, but the loss of voltage (voltage drop) within a specified hold time remains within an acceptable error margin for all but the most demanding applications.

== Purpose ==
Sample and hold circuits are used in linear systems. In some kinds of analog-to-digital converters (ADCs), the input is compared to a voltage generated internally from a digital-to-analog converter (DAC). The circuit tries a series of values and stops converting once the voltages are equal, within some defined error margin. If the input value was permitted to change during this comparison process, the resulting conversion would be inaccurate and possibly unrelated to the true input value. Such successive approximation converters will often incorporate internal sample and hold circuitry. In addition, sample and hold circuits are often used when multiple samples need to be measured at the same time. Each value is sampled and held, using a common sample clock.

For practically all commercial liquid crystal active matrix displays based on TN, IPS or VA electro-optic LC cells (excluding bi-stable phenomena), each pixel represents a small capacitor, which has to be periodically charged to a level corresponding to the greyscale value (contrast) desired for a picture element. In order to maintain the level during a scanning cycle (frame period), an additional electric capacitor is attached in parallel to each LC pixel to better hold the voltage. A thin-film FET switch is addressed to select a particular LC pixel and charge the picture information for it. In contrast to an S/H in general electronics, there is no output operational amplifier and no electrical signal AO. Instead, the charge on the hold capacitors controls the deformation of the LC molecules and thereby the optical effect as its output. The invention of this concept and its implementation in thin-film technology have been honored with the IEEE Jun-ichi Nishizawa Medal.

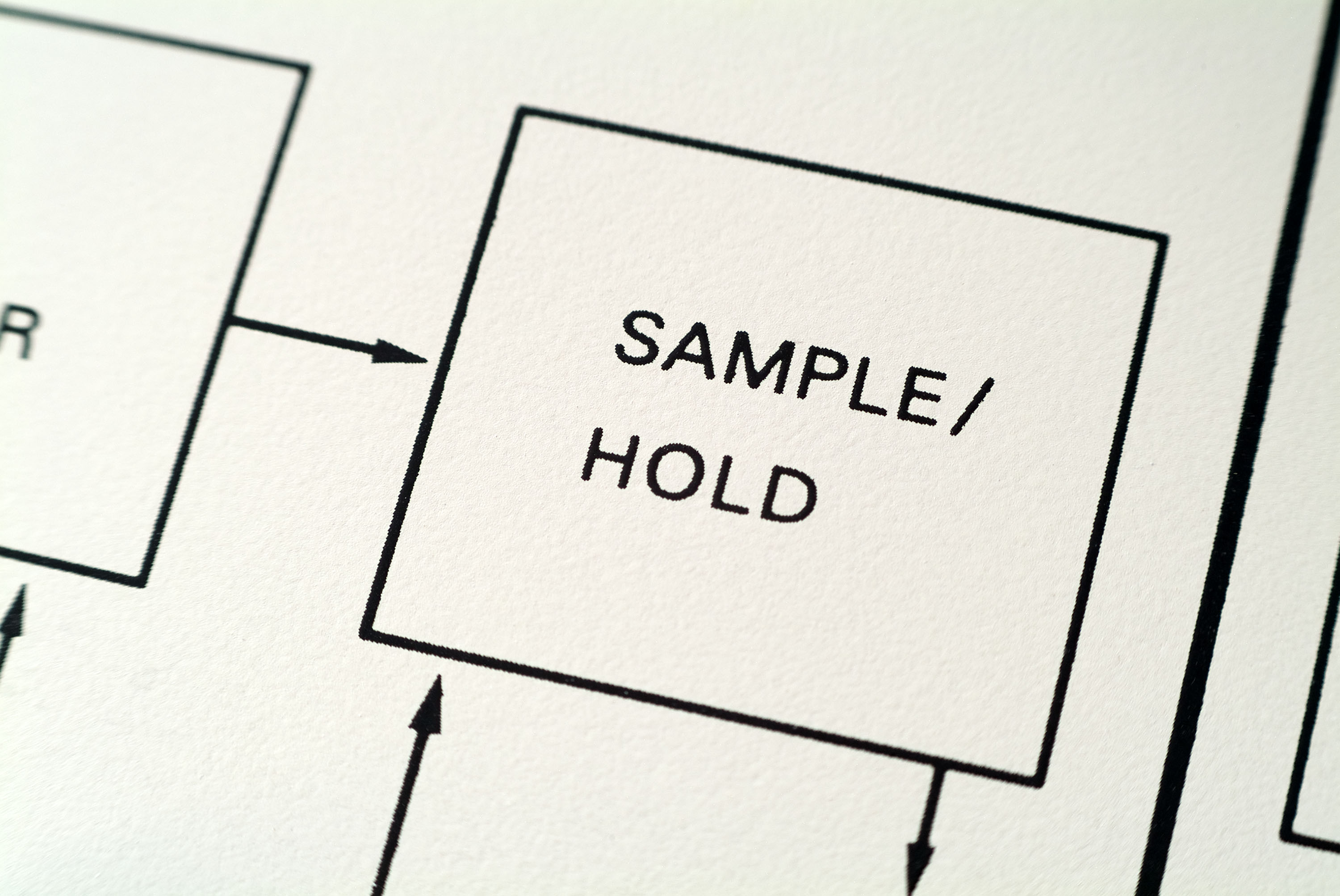
The sample and hold stencil on a Korg ARP Odyssey synthesizer.

During a scanning cycle, the picture doesn't follow the input signal. This does not allow the eye to refresh and can lead to blurring during motion sequences, also the transition is visible between frames because the backlight is constantly illuminated, adding to display motion blur.

Sample and hold circuits are also frequently found on synthesizers, either as a discrete module or as an integral component. They are used to take periodic samples of an incoming signal, typically as a source of modulation for other components of the synthesizer. When a sample and hold circuit is plugged into a white noise generator the result is a sequence of random values, which—depending on the amplitude of modulation—can be used to provide subtle variations in a signal or wildly varying random tones.

== Implementation ==
To keep the input voltage as stable as possible, it is essential that the capacitor have very low leakage, and that it not be loaded to any significant degree which calls for a very high input impedance.

== See also ==
- Analog signal to discrete time interval converter
