= Unity amplitude =

A sinusoidal waveform is said to have a unity amplitude when the amplitude of the wave is equal to 1.

$x(t) = a \sin(\theta(t))$

where $a = 1$. This terminology is most commonly used in digital signal processing and is usually associated with the Fourier series and Fourier transform sinusoids that involve a duty cycle, $\alpha$, and a defined fundamental period, $T_o$.

Analytic signals with unit amplitude satisfy the Bedrosian theorem.
