= Low-frequency electromagnetic compatibility =

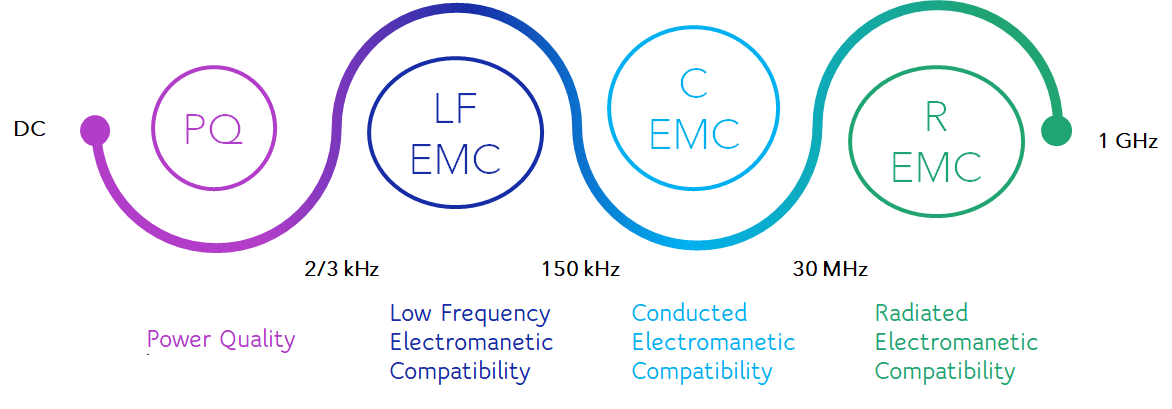
Frequency spectrum of harmonic pollution

Low-frequency electromagnetic compatibility (LF EMC) is a specific field in the domain of electromagnetic compatibility (EMC) and power quality (PQ), which deals with electromagnetic interference phenomena in the frequency range between 2 kHz and 150 kHz. It is a special frequency range because it does not fit in the PQ problems, with range of up to 2 kHz (3 kHz in 60 Hz mains frequency systems, such as the United States), where relative levels of voltage and current can have massive impact on efficiency and integrity of electric systems, and neither in the conducted EMC range, which starts at 150 kHz and influences mainly informational systems, and already too far from radiated EMC range, which starts at 30 MHz and goes up to 1 GHz.

This is a newer field of interest in PQ and EMC, stated by the fact that the professional community has not reached a consensus on terminology, LF EMC harmonics being called supraharmonics, and another fact being a void in standards considering the LF EMC frequency range.

== Causes ==
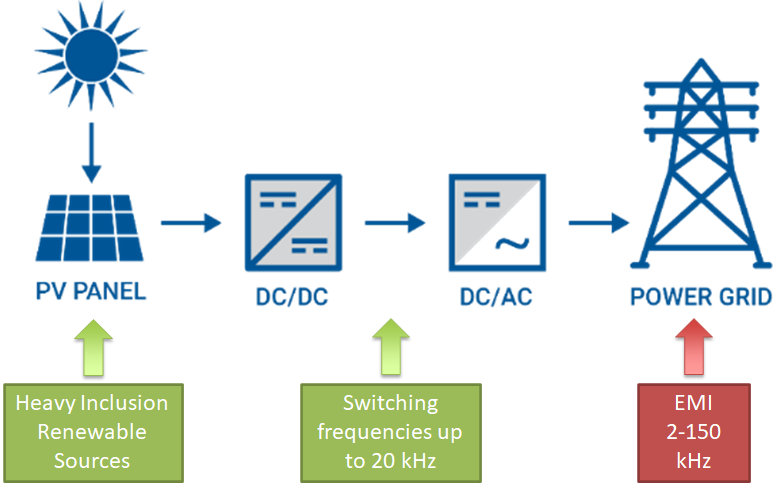
Generation of LF EMC harmonics due to smart grid

The main cause for the appearance of low frequency electromagnetic interferences in home and industrial electric systems is the dense integration of power electronics switching frequency. In time, switching power devices, such as transistors, became cheap, small and easy to use, invading all facets of human activity. The switching frequency of these devices got beyond 2 kHz and their power bearing capabilities grew to the point at which they started controlling electric devices, such as electric motors, that are more power hungry.

Another rising cause for 2–150 kHz disturbances in electric power systems is the continuous integration of renewable energy sources and the evolution of the power system to smart grid. The smart grid, at basis, uses ICT systems to control power inlets and outlets via power converters, meaning a heavy use of switching devices within the LF EMC range.

== Effect ==
The ratio of harmonic weight to the fundamental frequency in the LF EMC range also grew, leading to increased harmonic pollution, which disturbs the quality of power delivered to consumers, and disturbances to the informational and telecommunication systems nearby. The impact of the LF EMC was determined to have serious effects on all electrical connections and devices. The diagnosis of supraharmonics-related problems based on the effects on electrical equipment was researched by Sakar et al. The propagation of LF harmonics through LV and MV grids leads to interference with the elements for power delivery and end-user equipment, e.g., light flicker, aging of capacitors and cable terminations, audible noise and interruption of electric vehicle charging. As such incidents happen more often, the need for guidelines that facilitate the diagnosis of these problems arises. Different features of the LF distortion were shown to be responsible for different interferences. These problems were organized in problem specific flow charts for audible noise, cable terminations failure, unwanted tripping due to residual current devices, and flicker. On power converters, the LF harmonics were shown to generate in turn a series of EMC pollution problems. Interharmonics are one of the heaviest polluters in this interaction. Though the study was done on LED converters and low voltages, the impact on high voltage applications such as railway traction can have an amplified detrimental effect.

== Directions of development ==
Many challenges need to be considered in this relatively new field. A series of studies have already been published, but the professional community still has not solved some very important challenges in the low frequency domain of EMC and PQ. The Institute of Electrical and Electronics Engineers has already formed a technical committee to work on these issues, starting with the standardization issues.

- EMC/EMI and PQ in power converters
- EMC/EMI and PQ in transportation systems
- EMC/EMI and PQ for space systems
- EMC and PQ in unmanned vehicles
- EMC and PQ in smart grid
- EMC and PQ in wireless systems
- MC/EMI Challenges of railway electrification network
- The Biological Effects due to EMI at Low Frequency
- The Influence of 5G Transmission on EMC/EMI at Low Frequency
- EMI measurement in LF frequency
- Standardization challenges:
  - The standardization and new Standards in EMC at Low Frequency
  - New standardization in PQ
  - Standardization relationship between Low Frequency in EMC and PQ

== Standards ==
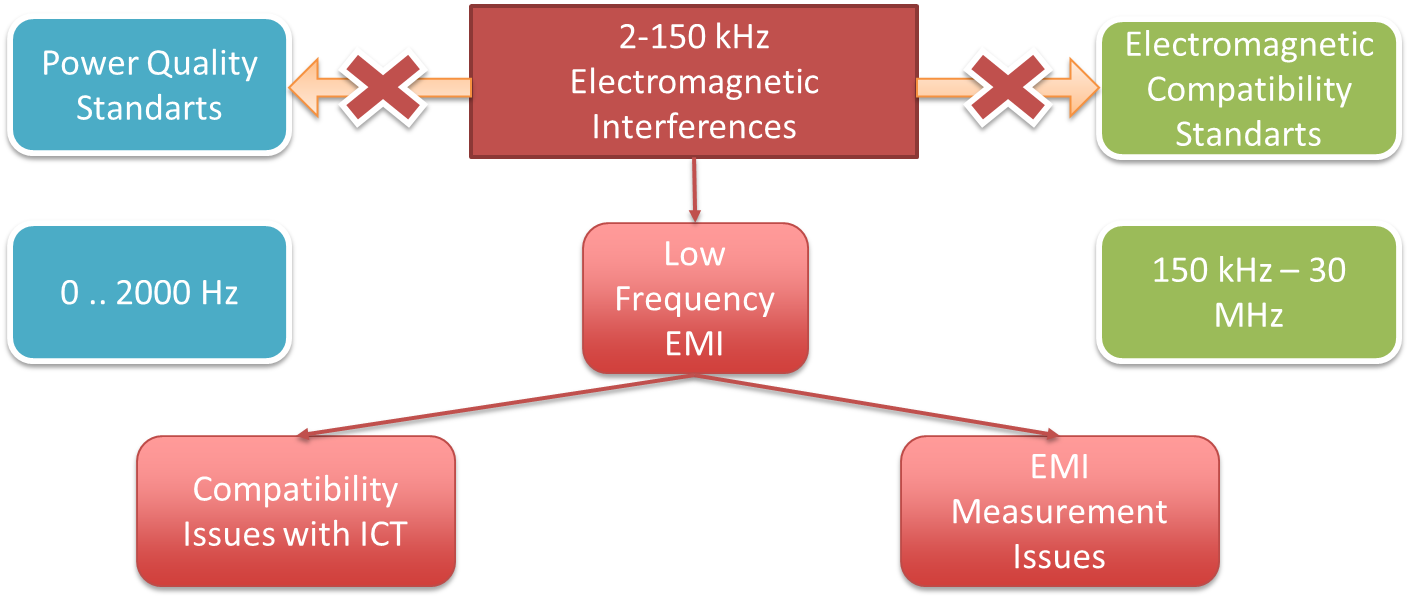
PQ, EMC and LF EMC standards coverage

The standardization issue with the frequency of 2–150 kHz is dual: on the one hand there are no specific and agreed upon standards that mandate the designers of electric systems to account for this range, and on the other hand there are no standards that would guide the measurement of EMI in this specific frequency range. There are standards that cover the PQ area, and EMC area, but in between there is a significant gap, that spurs issues with every new electric system or device.

== See also ==
- Conducted emissions
- Electric power quality
- Power factor
