= MSCE =

MSCE can mean:

- Master of Science in Engineering (MScE); see Civil engineering
- Master of Science in Civil Engineering; see Civil engineering
- Master of Science in Clinical Epidemiology
- Master of Science in Communications Engineering; see Telecommunications engineering
- Master of Science in Computer Engineering; see Computer Engineering
- Mobility and Supply Chain Engineering
