= Conducted emissions =

Conducted emissions are the effects in power quality that occur via electrical and magnetic coupling, electronic switch of semiconductor devices, which form a part of electromagnetic compatibility issues in electrical engineering. These affect the ability of all interconnected system devices in the electromagnetic environment, by restricting or limiting their intentional generation, propagation and reception of electromagnetic energy.

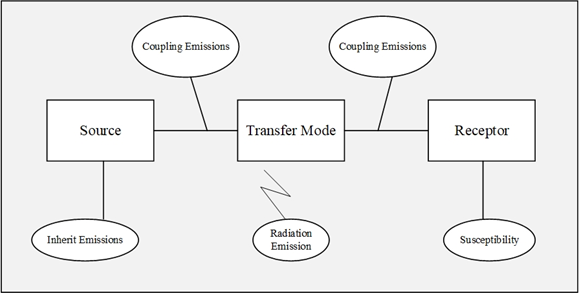
Fig. 1. Conducted Emission propagation from Source to Receptor

Conducted emissions consist a part of electromagnetic interference in circuits that mainly create issues in delivered power quality, owing to interference caused by harmonics arising due to linear & non-linear loads present in the electric system mainly due to increasing presence of switched mode power supply and other consumer electronics. Due to these aggregated interferences, the delivered electric power quality from the mains electricity system affects the performance of electrical home appliances. These could include a decrease in lumen output of bulbs, flicker and poor heating of induction coil in kettles, and heating elements of other home appliances in every-day use.

Following the effects of conducted emissions, the electric power quality is classified separately in common AC mains and DC mains systems. Since alternating current technology has been well established, the parameters and the effects in power quality in AC are well established. The parameter for measuring AC power quality is called is termed total harmonic distortion (%THD), and it measures the power quality of power supply for different voltage levels. Due to the recent developments in DC technology, the interconnections between DC and AC mains give rise to harmonic issues not previously experienced. Especially, the effects in DC power quality due to conducted emissions are not well understood. Moreover, the interconnections of AC and DC mains has given rise to further electromagnetic interference issues not previously known. Based on the current EMC standards, conducted emissions are measured from 150 kHz and 30 MHz, however there exists a gap in the electric power quality measured up to 2 kHz and the conducted emissions in the low frequency up to 150 kHz. The gap frequency range is termed Supraharmonics.

Further, following the advancements in telecommunications engineering, the presence of electronic devices has gradually increased in the AC mains grid network towards having more semiconductor based switch devices, giving rise to further electromagnetic interference issues due to conducted emissions in the near and far electromagnetic environment. The electric grid progresses towards becoming increasingly nonlinear system and newer issues in power quality are being addressed.

Technically, conducted emissions may be described as noise in the electric current or voltage generated by the electrical appliance or its susceptibility to it. The main difference between signal noise and emissions is that noise exists in a finite energy signal while emission exists in a finite power signal. As noise in measuring circuits gets filtered out using filters, the emission must be filtered at the device under test at either the AC Mains or the DC mains, depending on the device application. The emission source can exist from the source to the receptor and through the circuit where there is electron flow. Usually, the electrical appliance must be factory tested with standards for conducted emission, as the list of common EMC test standards denotes. Moreover, different manufacturers hold different versions of these standards as fit best to their appliances and warranty schemes.

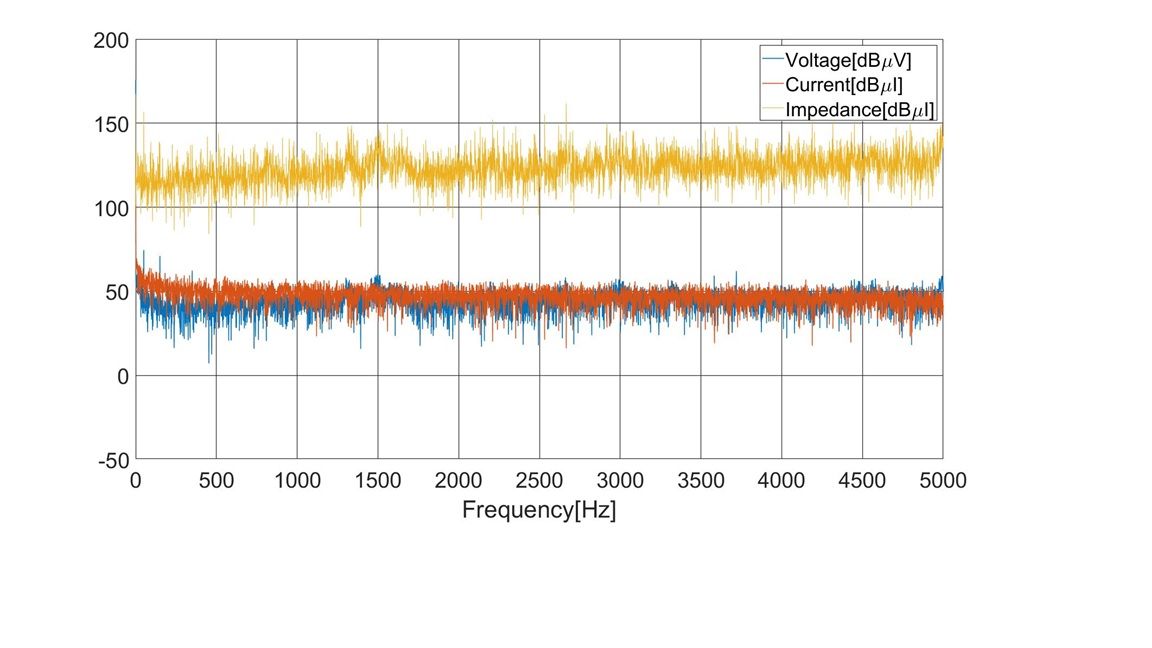
Fig. 2. Conducted Emissions from a commercial DC buck converter

Conducted emissions in electric supply system could be described as non-linearity or deviations observed in electric parameters. In AC, the variations are observed in the harmonics, while in DC they are observed as non-linearity observed in time-domain and unexpected frequency peaks in frequency domain. The effects of conducted emissions in power quality in AC mains are well established in IEC standards, particularly in IEC Std 519–2014. Further, conducted emissions in DC are from multiple sources including electronic devices, non-linear loads and other rotating magnetic field devices. In electronic devices, these are mainly from the interactions in the RLC circuit and the switching frequency. When loads like motors and generators that have DC magnetic fields, the conducted emission are non-linear and difficult to predict. Further, the effects of conducted emissions in DC power quality is not well understood and is being researched extensively.

== Effects on electric power quality ==
Electric power quality in AC mains is well developed and established with empirical data gathered over a century. Many parameters exist to determine and calculate the harmonic along with the noise. Concerning DC mains, much of the DC technology research for electric power distribution was abandoned in the 1920s after it was decided that AC alternating systems were to be applied over large distances. However, due to recent developments in photovoltaic system rooftop solutions and lesser electronic conversion stages required between AC & DC, researchers are now considering DC to be used to supply power to household appliances at low voltage and extra-low voltage levels.

=== Harmonics in AC Mains ===
For alternating current technology has been well established in the modern world, the parameter for measuring conducted emissions is well understood and is called total harmonic distortion (%THD). It measures power quality of AC mains for different voltage levels as described in common EMC test standards. By definition, the AC harmonic is a multiple of the electrical quantity (voltage or current) at multiples of the fundamental frequency of the system, produced by the action of non-linear loads such as rectifier, lighting, or saturated magnetic devices. Harmonic frequencies in the power grid are a frequent cause of power quality problems and can result in increased heating in the equipment and conductors, misfiring in variable speed drives, and torque pulsations in motors. Depending on the frequency of the harmonics, the harmonic pollution is categorized in problems of electric power quality (frequency up to harmonic order 40), electromagnetic compatibility (frequency higher than 150 kHz), and low frequency compatibility (frequency between 2/3 kHz and 150 kHz).

=== Harmonics in DC Mains ===
Unlike AC, DC has no fundamental frequency or period and hence there cannot be a multiple of the fundamental frequency over which harmonics can be calculated. Further, the frequency range over which DC harmonics are calculated might not be the same as AC harmonics. Much of research covering DC harmonics suggest use of a percentage low frequency sinusoidal disturbance (%LFSD). This quantity measures the deviations that the DC quantity (voltage or current) over a specified measurement window or an analysis window in a frequency range. The percentage of root of squared summations of these deviations gives a total %LFSD value, which is a near equivalent of the %THD value in AC systems. Further, the DC harmonics are being studied in two frequency bandwidth as per the interference observed empirically.

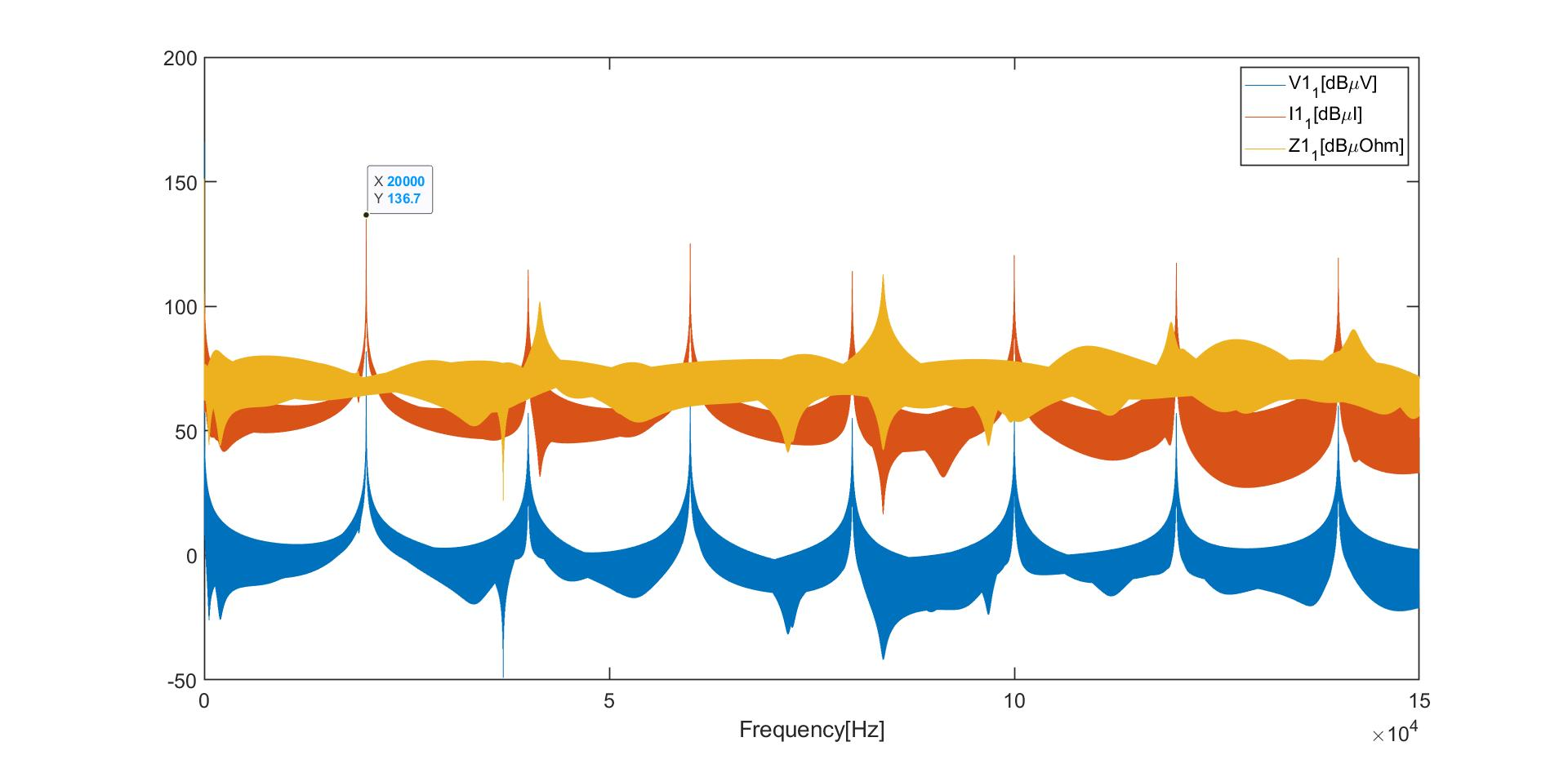
Fig. 3. Supraharmonics from DC buck converter

Other issues with power quality in DC mains are to do with frequency range for conducted emissions in the electromagnetic spectrum. In the range of 0–2 kHz, commonly termed as garbage band, the DC harmonic quantity is calculated using an analogue of AC harmonics in frequency domain. However, as per the expected interactions between AC and DC systems and due to presence of power electronic devices and switched-mode power supply, the frequency range 2–150 kHz, recently termed as supraharmonics is being researched. It is primarily understood that due to the presence of electronic switching non-linear loads, the filter circuits tend to push emissions away into higher frequency bands.

- Garbage Band

This frequency bandwidth is in the range of 0–2 kHz and is equivalent to the same frequency range as AC harmonics. The name suggest that lower amount of conducted emissions are expected due to advancements in filters. It is widely accepted among researchers that the %LFSD value should be sufficient to address the DC harmonics and relate to the %THD in AC harmonics.

- Supraharmonics

This frequency bandwidth is in the range of 2–150 kHz and is termed as supraharmonics. The frequency bandwidth was previously ignored and was considered as a gap between radiated emission and conducted emission. The current research suggest that much effort is being given to understand measurement methods for supraharmonic emissions to further standardize DC power quality to include short circuits, voltage variations and other factors as well.

As per Thais.M.Mendes et al., the effects of Supraharmonic emissions are confined to neighboring devices and do not propagate over long distances. Defining the measurement window and analysis window is one of the appropriate way to standardize conducted emissions. Measurements as per IEC 61000-4-7, IEC 61000-4-30, IEC-61000-4-19 and other CISPR standards show that each method can be effective but have its own limitations. Further, as per M.Klattt et al. measurement windows should be used in standardizing the framework for supraharmonic standards. Moreover, V.Khokhlov et al. suggests that all the existing standards have limitations that can be overcome by combining time-based analysis with frequency domain analysis.
