= Telecommunications engineering =

Subfield of electronics engineering

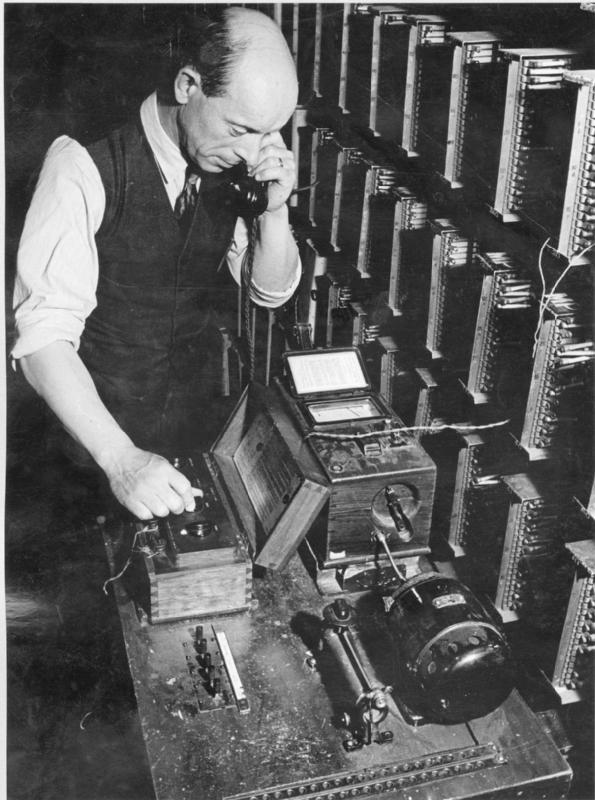
Telecommunications engineer working to maintain London's phone service during World War 2, in 1942.

Telecommunications engineering is a subfield of Electrical engineering which seeks to design and devise systems of communication at a distance. The work ranges from basic circuit design to strategic mass developments. A telecommunication engineer is responsible for designing and overseeing the installation of telecommunications equipment and facilities, such as complex electronic switching systems, and other plain old telephone service facilities, optical fiber cabling, IP networks, and microwave transmission systems. Telecommunications engineering also overlaps with broadcast engineering.

Telecommunications is a diverse field of engineering connected to electronic, civil, and systems engineering. Ultimately, telecom engineers are responsible for providing high-speed data transmission services. They use a variety of equipment and transport media to design the telecom network infrastructure; the most common media used by wired telecommunications today are twisted pair, coaxial cables, and optical fibers. Telecommunications engineers also provide solutions revolving around wireless modes of communication and information transfer, such as wireless telephony services, radio and satellite communications, internet, Wi-Fi and broadband technologies.

== History ==
Telecommunication systems are generally designed by telecommunication engineers which sprang from technological improvements in the telegraph industry in the late 19th century and the radio and the telephone industries in the early 20th century. Today, telecommunication is widespread and devices that assist the process, such as the television, radio and telephone, are common in many parts of the world. There are also many networks that connect these devices, including computer networks, public switched telephone network (PSTN), radio networks, and television networks. Computer communication across the Internet is one of many examples of telecommunication. Telecommunication plays a vital role in the world economy, and the telecommunication industry's revenue has been placed at just under 3% of the gross world product.

=== Telegraph and telephone ===
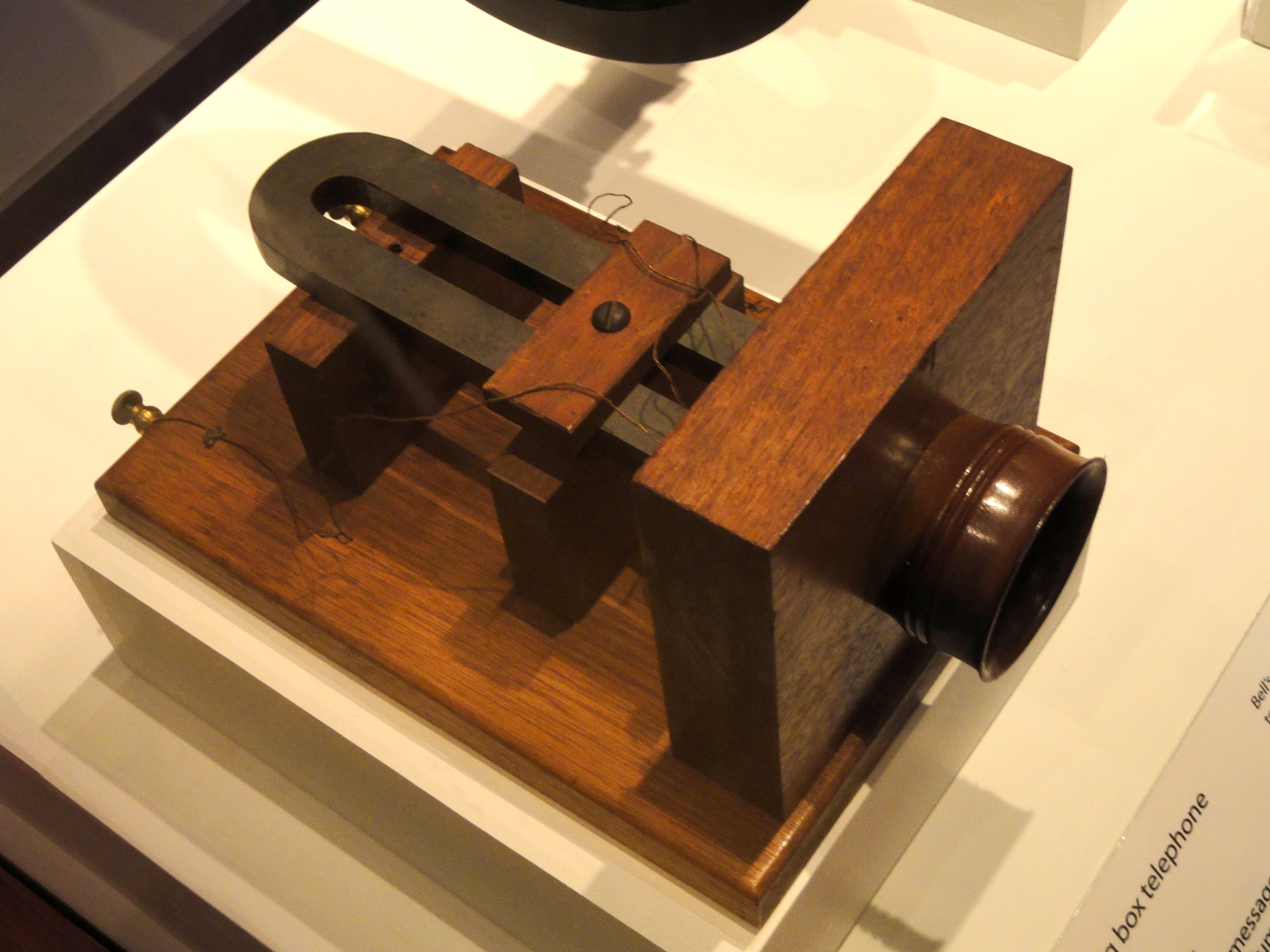
Alexander Graham Bell's big box telephone, 1876, one of the first commercially available telephones - National Museum of American History

Samuel Morse independently developed a version of the electrical telegraph that he unsuccessfully demonstrated on 2 September 1837. Soon after he was joined by Alfred Vail who developed the register — a telegraph terminal that integrated a logging device for recording messages to paper tape. This was demonstrated successfully over three miles (five kilometres) on 6 January 1838 and eventually over forty miles (sixty-four kilometres) between Washington, D.C. and Baltimore on 24 May 1844. The patented invention proved lucrative and by 1851 telegraph lines in the United States spanned over 20,000 miles (32,000 kilometres).

The first successful transatlantic telegraph cable was completed on 27 July 1866, allowing transatlantic telecommunication for the first time. Earlier transatlantic cables installed in 1857 and 1858 only operated for a few days or weeks before they failed. The international use of the telegraph has sometimes been dubbed the "Victorian Internet".

The first commercial telephone services were set up in 1878 and 1879 on both sides of the Atlantic in the cities of New Haven and London. Alexander Graham Bell held the master patent for the telephone that was needed for such services in both countries. The technology grew quickly from this point, with inter-city lines being built and telephone exchanges in every major city of the United States by the mid-1880s. Despite this, transatlantic voice communication remained impossible for customers until January 7, 1927, when a connection was established using radio. However no cable connection existed until TAT-1 was inaugurated on September 25, 1956, providing 36 telephone circuits.

In 1880, Bell and co-inventor Charles Sumner Tainter conducted the world's first wireless telephone call via modulated lightbeams projected by photophones. The scientific principles of their invention would not be utilized for several decades, when they were first deployed in military and fiber-optic communications.

=== Radio and television ===
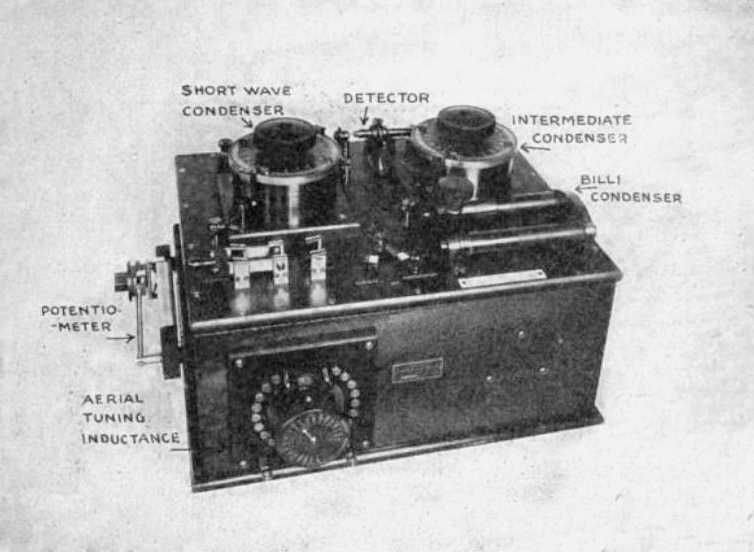
Marconi crystal radio receiver

Over several years starting in 1894, the Italian inventor Guglielmo Marconi built the first complete, commercially successful wireless telegraphy system based on airborne electromagnetic waves (radio transmission). In December 1901, he would go on to established wireless communication between Britain and Newfoundland, earning him the Nobel Prize in physics in 1909 (which he shared with Karl Braun). In 1900, Reginald Fessenden was able to wirelessly transmit a human voice. On March 25, 1925, Scottish inventor John Logie Baird publicly demonstrated the transmission of moving silhouette pictures at the London department store Selfridges. In October 1925, Baird was successful in obtaining moving pictures with halftone shades, which were by most accounts the first true television pictures. This led to a public demonstration of the improved device on 26 January 1926 again at Selfridges. Baird's first devices relied upon the Nipkow disk and thus became known as the mechanical television. It formed the basis of semi-experimental broadcasts done by the British Broadcasting Corporation beginning September 30, 1929.

=== Satellite ===
The first U.S. satellite to relay communications was Project SCORE in 1958, which used a tape recorder to store and forward voice messages. It was used to send a Christmas greeting to the world from U.S. President Dwight D. Eisenhower. In 1960 NASA launched an Echo satellite; the 100-foot (30 m) aluminized PET film balloon served as a passive reflector for radio communications. Courier 1B, built by Philco, also launched in 1960, was the world's first active repeater satellite. Satellites these days are used for many applications such as uses in GPS, television, internet and telephone uses.

Telstar was the first active, direct relay commercial communications satellite. Belonging to AT&T as part of a multi-national agreement between AT&T, Bell Telephone Laboratories, NASA, the British General Post Office, and the French National PTT (Post Office) to develop satellite communications, it was launched by NASA from Cape Canaveral on July 10, 1962, the first privately sponsored space launch. Relay 1 was launched on December 13, 1962, and became the first satellite to broadcast across the Pacific on November 22, 1963.

The first and historically most important application for communication satellites was in intercontinental long distance telephony. The fixed Public Switched Telephone Network relays telephone calls from land line telephones to an earth station, where they are then transmitted a receiving satellite dish via a geostationary satellite in Earth orbit. Improvements in submarine communications cables, through the use of fiber-optics, caused some decline in the use of satellites for fixed telephony in the late 20th century, but they still exclusively service remote islands such as Ascension Island, Saint Helena, Diego Garcia, and Easter Island, where no submarine cables are in service. There are also some continents and some regions of countries where landline telecommunications are rare to nonexistent, for example Antarctica, plus large regions of Australia, South America, Africa, Northern Canada, China, Russia and Greenland.

After commercial long distance telephone service was established via communication satellites, a host of other commercial telecommunications were also adapted to similar satellites starting in 1979, including mobile satellite phones, satellite radio, satellite television and satellite Internet access. The earliest adaption for most such services occurred in the 1990s as the pricing for commercial satellite transponder channels continued to drop significantly.

=== Computer networks and the Internet ===
Symbolic representation of the Arpanet as of September 1974

On 11 September 1940, George Stibitz was able to transmit problems using teleprinter to his Complex Number Calculator in New York and receive the computed results back at Dartmouth College in New Hampshire. This configuration of a centralized computer or mainframe computer with remote "dumb terminals" remained popular throughout the 1950s and into the 1960s. However, it was not until the 1960s that researchers started to investigate packet switching — a technology that allows chunks of data to be sent between different computers without first passing through a centralized mainframe. A four-node network emerged on 5 December 1969. This network soon became the ARPANET, which by 1981 would consist of 213 nodes.

ARPANET's development centered around the Request for Comment process and on 7 April 1969, RFC 1 was published. This process is important because ARPANET would eventually merge with other networks to form the Internet, and many of the communication protocols that the Internet relies upon today were specified through the Request for Comment process. In September 1981, RFC 791 introduced the Internet Protocol version 4 (IPv4) and RFC 793 introduced the Transmission Control Protocol (TCP) — thus creating the TCP/IP protocol that much of the Internet relies upon today.

=== Optical fiber ===
Optical fiber

Optical fiber can be used as a medium for telecommunication and computer networking because it is flexible and can be bundled into cables. It is especially advantageous for long-distance communications, because light propagates through the fiber with little attenuation compared to electrical cables. This allows long distances to be spanned with few repeaters.

In 1966 Charles K. Kao and George Hockham proposed optical fibers at STC Laboratories (STL) at Harlow, England, when they showed that the losses of 1000 dB/km in existing glass (compared to 5-10 dB/km in coaxial cable) was due to contaminants, which could potentially be removed.

Optical fiber was successfully developed in 1970 by Corning Glass Works, with attenuation low enough for communication purposes (about 20dB/km), and at the same time GaAs (Gallium arsenide) semiconductor lasers were developed that were compact and therefore suitable for transmitting light through fiber optic cables for long distances.

After a period of research starting from 1975, the first commercial fiber-optic communications system was developed, which operated at a wavelength around 0.8 μm and used GaAs semiconductor lasers. This first-generation system operated at a bit rate of 45 Mbps with repeater spacing of up to 10 km. Soon on 22 April 1977, General Telephone and Electronics sent the first live telephone traffic through fiber optics at a 6 Mbit/s throughput in Long Beach, California.

The first wide area network fibre optic cable system in the world seems to have been installed by Rediffusion in Hastings, East Sussex, UK in 1978. The cables were placed in ducting throughout the town, and had over 1000 subscribers. They were used at that time for the transmission of television channels, not available because of local reception problems.

The first transatlantic telephone cable to use optical fiber was TAT-8, based on Desurvire optimized laser amplification technology. It went into operation in 1988.

In the late 1990s through 2000, industry promoters, and research companies such as KMI, and RHK predicted massive increases in demand for communications bandwidth due to increased use of the Internet, and commercialization of various bandwidth-intensive consumer services, such as video on demand, Internet Protocol data traffic was increasing exponentially, at a faster rate than integrated circuit complexity had increased under Moore's Law.

== Concepts ==
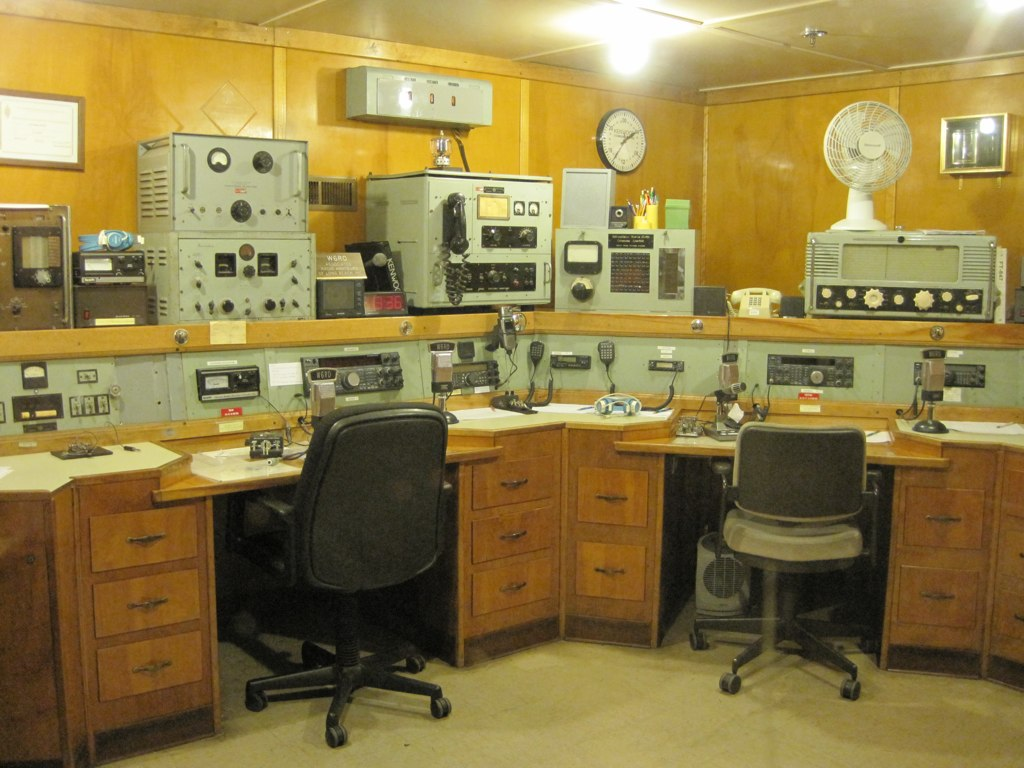
Radio transmitter room

=== Basic elements of a telecommunication system ===
==== Transmitter ====
Transmitter (information source) that takes information and converts it to a signal for transmission. In electronics and telecommunications a transmitter or radio transmitter is an electronic device which, with the aid of an antenna, produces radio waves. In addition to their use in broadcasting, transmitters are necessary component parts of many electronic devices that communicate by radio, such as cell phones,

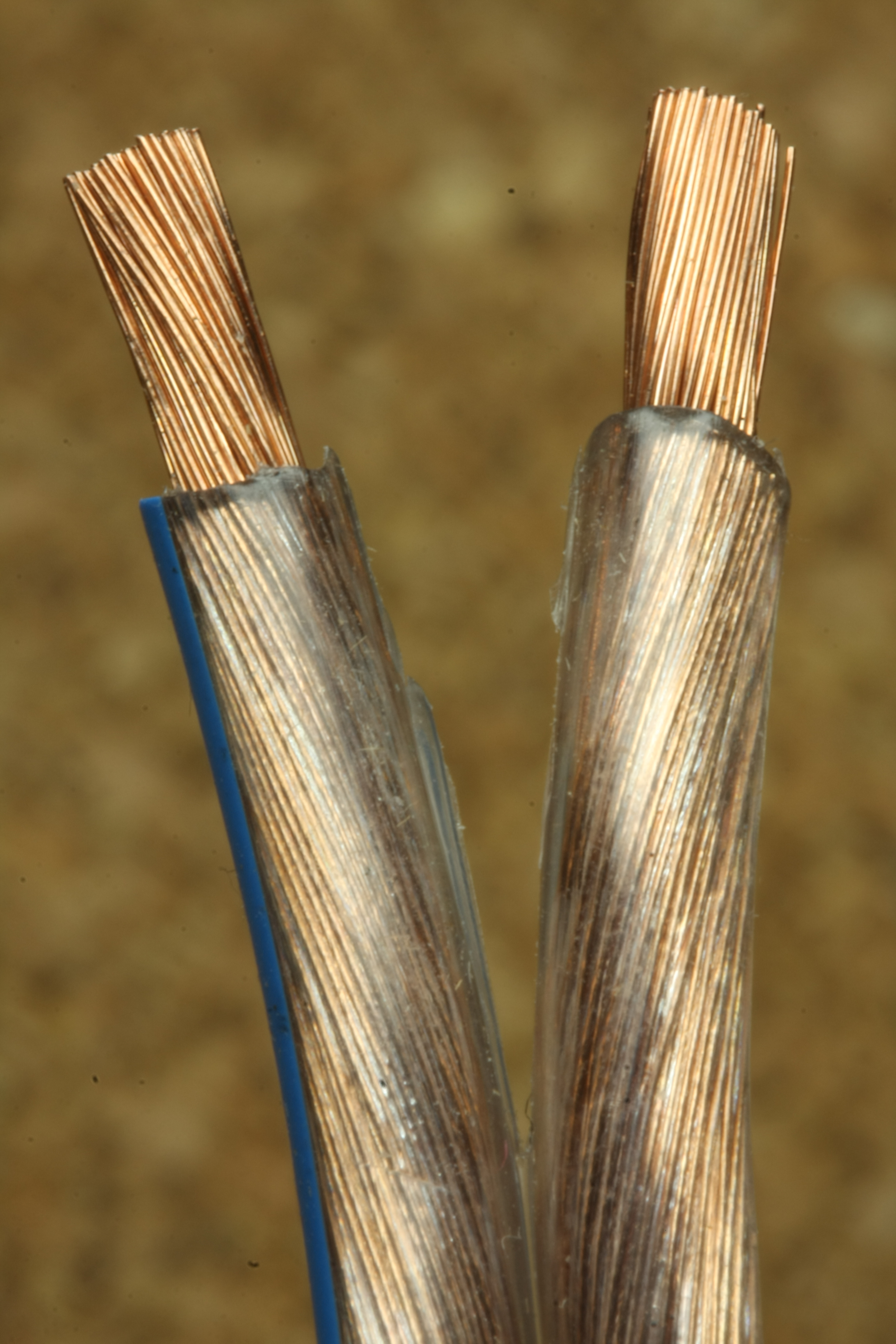
Copper wires

==== Transmission medium ====
Transmission medium over which the signal is transmitted. For example, the transmission medium for sounds is usually air, but solids and liquids may also act as transmission media for sound. Many transmission media are used as communications channel. One of the most common physical media used in networking is copper wire. Copper wire is used to carry signals to long distances using relatively low amounts of power. Another example of a physical medium is optical fiber, which has emerged as the most commonly used transmission medium for long-distance communications. Optical fiber is a thin strand of glass that guides light along its length.

The absence of a material medium in vacuum may also constitute a transmission medium for electromagnetic waves such as light and radio waves.

==== Receiver ====
Receiver (information sink) that receives and converts the signal back into required information. In radio communications, a radio receiver is an electronic device that receives radio waves and converts the information carried by them to a usable form. It is used with an antenna. The information produced by the receiver may be in the form of sound (an audio signal), images (a video signal) or digital data.

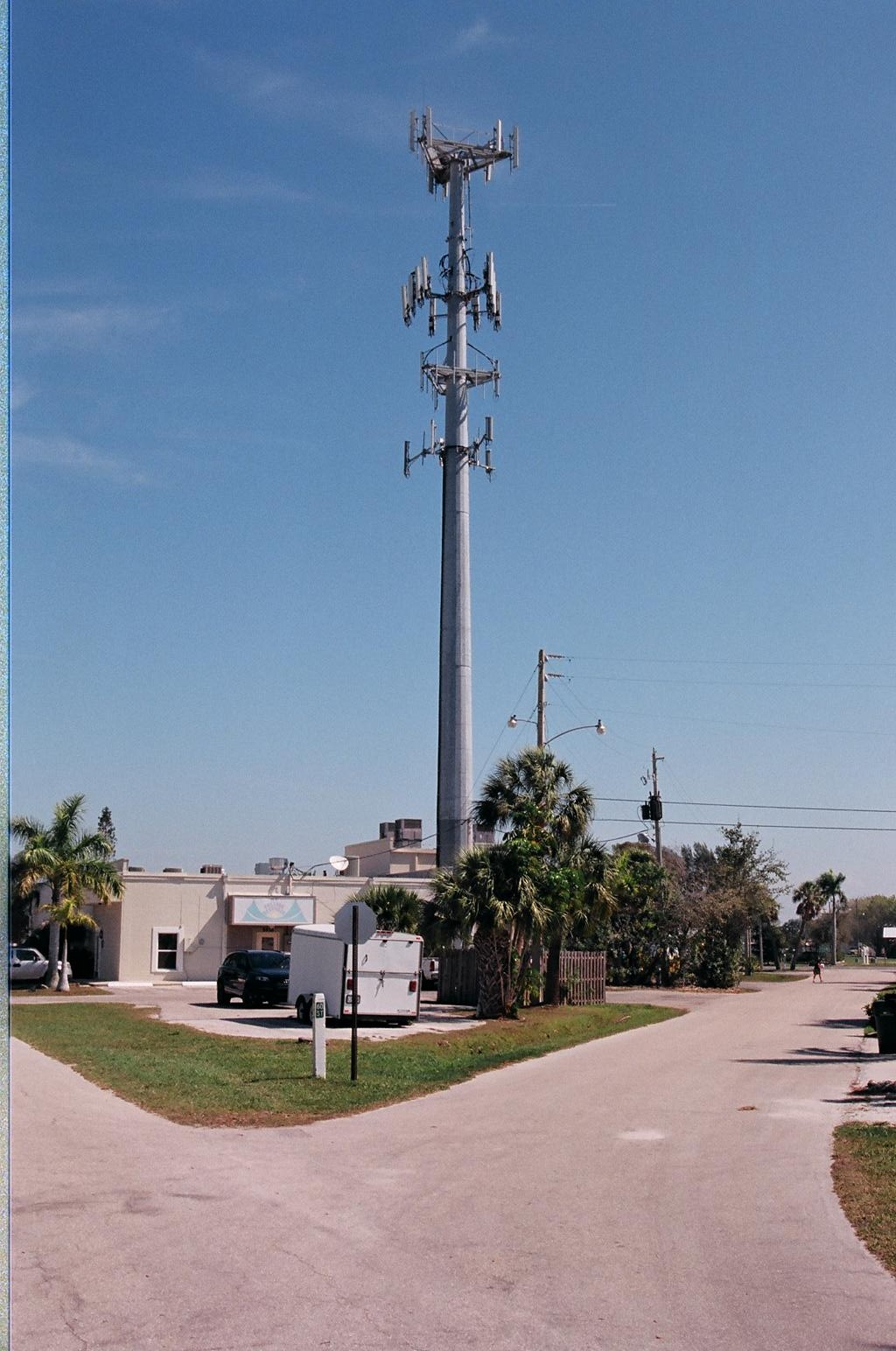
Wireless communication tower, cell site

=== Wired communication ===
Wired communications make use of underground communications cables (less often, overhead lines), electronic signal amplifiers (repeaters) inserted into connecting cables at specified points, and terminal apparatus of various types, depending on the type of wired communications used.

=== Wireless communication ===
Wireless communication involves the transmission of information over a distance without the help of wires, cables or any other forms of electrical conductors. Wireless operations permit services, such as long-range communications, that are impossible or impractical to implement with the use of wires. The term is commonly used in the telecommunications industry to refer to telecommunications systems (e.g. radio transmitters and receivers, remote controls etc.) which use some form of energy (e.g. radio waves, acoustic energy, etc.) to transfer information without the use of wires. Information is transferred in this manner over both short and long distances.

== Roles ==
=== Telecom equipment engineer ===
A telecom equipment engineer is an electronics engineer that designs equipment such as routers, switches, multiplexers, and other specialized computer/electronics equipment designed to be used in the telecommunication network infrastructure.

=== Network engineer ===
A network engineer is a computer engineer who is in charge of designing, deploying, and maintaining computer networks. In addition, they oversee network operations from a network operations center, design backbone infrastructure, or supervise interconnections in a data center.

=== Central-office engineer ===
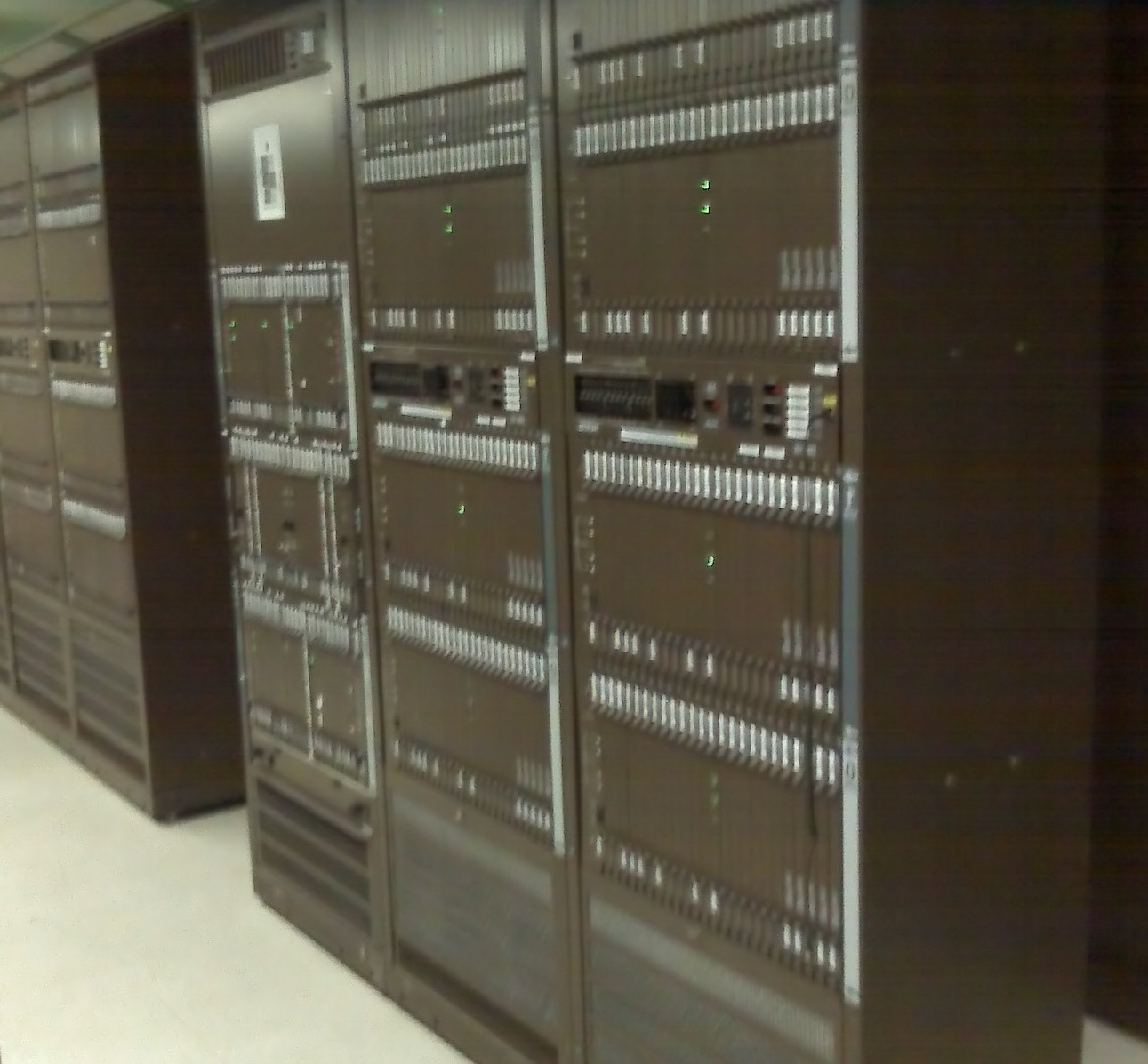
Typical Northern Telecom DMS100 Telephone Central Office Installation

A central-office engineer is responsible for designing and overseeing the implementation of telecommunications equipment in a central office (CO for short), also referred to as a wire center or telephone exchange A CO engineer is responsible for integrating new technology into the existing network, assigning the equipment's location in the wire center, and providing power, clocking (for digital equipment), and alarm monitoring facilities for the new equipment. The CO engineer is also responsible for providing more power, clocking, and alarm monitoring facilities if there are currently not enough available to support the new equipment being installed. Finally, the CO engineer is responsible for designing how the massive amounts of cable will be distributed to various equipment and wiring frames throughout the wire center and overseeing the installation and turn up of all new equipment.

==== Sub-roles ====
As structural engineers, CO engineers are responsible for the structural design and placement of racking and bays for the equipment to be installed in as well as for the plant to be placed on.

As electrical engineers, CO engineers are responsible for the resistance, capacitance, and inductance (RCL) design of all new plant to ensure telephone service is clear and crisp and data service is clean as well as reliable. Attenuation or gradual loss in intensity and loop loss calculations are required to determine cable length and size required to provide the service called for. In addition, power requirements have to be calculated and provided to power any electronic equipment being placed in the wire center.

Overall, CO engineers have seen new challenges emerging in the CO environment. With the advent of Data Centers, Internet Protocol (IP) facilities, cellular radio sites, and other emerging-technology equipment environments within telecommunication networks, it is important that a consistent set of established practices or requirements be implemented.

Installation suppliers or their sub-contractors are expected to provide requirements with their products, features, or services. These services might be associated with the installation of new or expanded equipment, as well as the removal of existing equipment.

Several other factors must be considered such as:

- Regulations and safety in installation
- Removal of hazardous material
- Commonly used tools to perform installation and removal of equipment

=== Outside-plant engineer ===
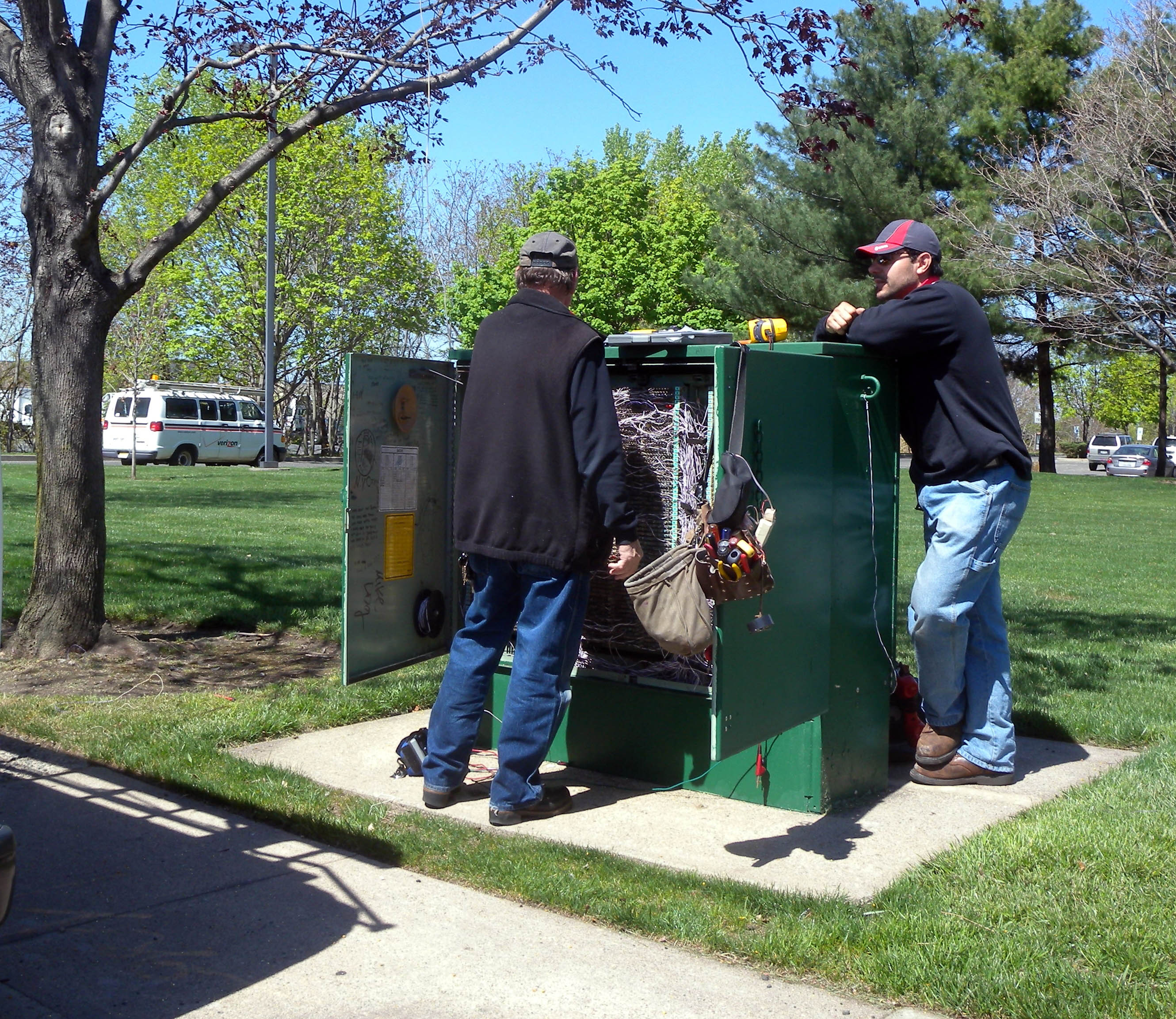
Engineers working on a cross-connect box, also known as a serving area interface

Outside plant (OSP) engineers are also often called field engineers, because they frequently spend much time in the field taking notes about the civil environment, aerial, above ground, and below ground. OSP engineers are responsible for taking plant (copper, fiber, etc.) from a wire center to a distribution point or destination point directly. If a distribution point design is used, then a cross-connect box is placed in a strategic location to feed a determined distribution area.

The cross-connect box, also known as a serving area interface, is then installed to allow connections to be made more easily from the wire center to the destination point and ties up fewer facilities by not having dedication facilities from the wire center to every destination point. The plant is then taken directly to its destination point or to another small closure called a terminal, where access can also be gained to the plant, if necessary. These access points are preferred as they allow faster repair times for customers and save telephone operating companies large amounts of money.

The plant facilities can be delivered via underground facilities, either direct buried or through conduit or in some cases laid under water, via aerial facilities such as telephone or power poles, or via microwave radio signals for long distances where either of the other two methods is too costly.

==== Sub-roles ====
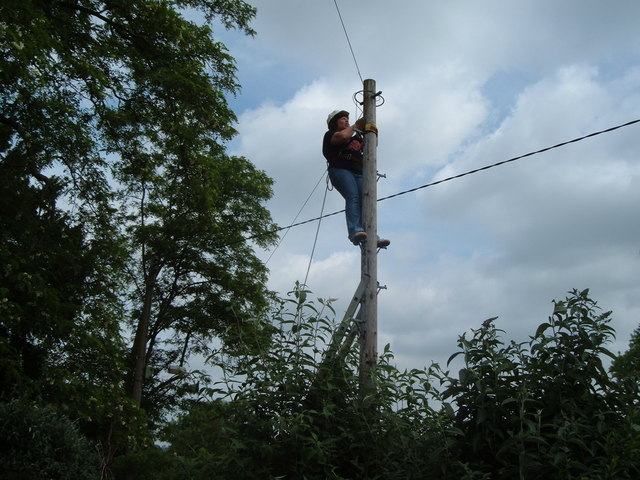
Engineer (OSP) climbing a telephone pole

As structural engineers, OSP engineers are responsible for the structural design and placement of cellular towers and telephone poles as well as calculating pole capabilities of existing telephone or power poles onto which new plant is being added. Structural calculations are required when boring under heavy traffic areas such as highways or when attaching to other structures such as bridges. Shoring also has to be taken into consideration for larger trenches or pits. Conduit structures often include encasements of slurry that needs to be designed to support the structure and withstand the environment around it (soil type, high traffic areas, etc.).

As electrical engineers, OSP engineers are responsible for the resistance, capacitance, and inductance (RCL) design of all new plant to ensure telephone service is clear and crisp and data service is clean as well as reliable. Attenuation or gradual loss in intensity and loop loss calculations are required to determine cable length and size required to provide the service called for. In addition power requirements have to be calculated and provided to power any electronic equipment being placed in the field. Ground potential has to be taken into consideration when placing equipment, facilities, and plant in the field to account for lightning strikes, high voltage intercept from improperly grounded or broken power company facilities, and from various sources of electromagnetic interference.

As civil engineers, OSP engineers are responsible for drafting plans, either by hand or using Computer-aided design (CAD) software, for how telecom plant facilities will be placed. Often when working with municipalities trenching or boring permits are required and drawings must be made for these. Often these drawings include about 70% or so of the detailed information required to pave a road or add a turn lane to an existing street. Structural calculations are required when boring under heavy traffic areas such as highways or when attaching to other structures such as bridges. As civil engineers, telecom engineers provide the modern communications backbone for all technological communications distributed throughout civilizations today.

In telecommunication engineering, air-core cables are used in conjunction with systems of air-handling equipment, including compressors, manifolds, regulators, and networks of air pipes. These system maintain pressurization within splice cases to reduce moisture ingress and support signal integrity in copper cables.

As political and social ambassador, the OSP engineer is a telephone operating company's face and voice to the local authorities and other utilities. OSP engineers often meet with municipalities, construction companies and other utility companies to address their concerns and educate them about how the telephone utility works and operates. Additionally, the OSP engineer has to secure real estate in which to place outside facilities, such as an easement to place a cross-connect box.

== See also ==
- Computer engineering
- Computer networking
- Electronic design automation
- Electronic engineering
- Electronic media
- Fiber-optic communication
- History of telecommunication
- Information theory
- List of electrical engineering topics (alphabetical)
- List of electrical engineering topics (thematic)
- Professional engineer
- Radio
- Receiver (radio)
- Telecommunication
- Telephone
- Television
- Telecommunications cable
- Transmission medium
- Transmitter
- Two-way radio
- Wired communication
- Wireless
