= Wireless =

Wireless may refer to:

== Electronic communications ==
- Wireless communication, the transfer of information signals without using wires
  - Wireless network
    - Wireless LAN, a wireless local-area computer network
  - Wireless phone, a less-often used name for a mobile phone
  - Wireless, former British and Commonwealth term for a radio receiver

== Other electronics ==
- Wireless charging, or inductive charging, the transfer of energy through electromagnetic induction

== Music ==
- Wireless (band), a Canadian rock band from the 1970s and 1980s
  - Wireless (Wireless album), 1976 debut album by the band Wireless
- Wireless (Threshold album), 2003 album by the band Threshold
- Wireless Festival, a music festival held every year since 2005 in Hyde Park, London
- "Wireless", a song from the 1996 Cardiacs album Sing to God
- "Wireless", a 2023 single by Within Temptation.

== Books ==
- Wireless: The Essential Charles Stross, a 2009 science fiction collection by Charles Stross
- "Wireless" (short story), a 1902 short story by Rudyard Kipling
- "Wireless" (Christie short story), a short story by Agatha Christie
