= Pulse-width modulation =

Representation of a signal as a rectangular wave with varying duty cycle

Varying the pulse width of a signal is a method of representing an analog signal as a rectangular wave with a varying duty cycle.

Pulse-width modulation (PWM), also known as pulse-duration modulation (PDM) (Note: Not to be confused with pulse-density modulation, also abbreviated as PDM.) or pulse-length modulation (PLM), is any method of representing a signal as a rectangular wave with a varying duty cycle (and for some methods also a varying period).

PWM is useful for controlling the average power or amplitude delivered by an electrical signal. The average value of voltage (and current) fed to the load is controlled by switching the supply between 0 and 100% at a rate faster than it takes the load to change significantly. The longer the switch is on, the higher the total power supplied to the load. Along with maximum power point tracking (MPPT), it is one of the primary methods of controlling the output of solar panels to that which can be utilized by a battery. PWM is particularly suited for running inertial loads such as motors, which are not as easily affected by this discrete switching. The goal of PWM is to control a load; however, the PWM switching frequency must be selected carefully in order to do so smoothly.

The PWM switching frequency can vary greatly depending on load and application. For example, switching only has to be done several times a minute in an electric stove, 100 or 120 Hz (double of the utility frequency) in a lamp dimmer, between a few kilohertz (kHz) and tens of kHz for a motor drive, and well into the tens or hundreds of kHz in audio amplifiers and computer power supplies. Choosing a switching frequency that is too high for the application may cause premature failure of mechanical control components, despite getting smooth control of the load. Selecting a switching frequency that is too low for the application causes oscillations in the load. The main advantage of PWM is that power loss in the switching devices is very low. When a switch is off, there is practically no current, and when it is on and power is being transferred to the load, there is almost no voltage drop across the switch. Power loss, being the product of voltage and current, is thus in both cases close to zero. PWM also works well with digital controls, which, because of their on/off nature, can easily set the needed duty cycle. PWM has also been used in certain communication systems where its duty cycle has been used to convey information over a communications channel.

== Duty cycle ==
The term duty cycle describes the proportion of 'on' time to the regular interval or 'period' of time; a low duty cycle corresponds to low power, because the power is off for most of the time. Duty cycle is expressed in percent, 100% being fully on. When a digital signal is on half of the time and off the other half of the time, the digital signal has a duty cycle of 50% and resembles a "square" wave. When a digital signal spends more time in the on state than the off state, it has a duty cycle of >50%. When a digital signal spends more time in the off state than the on state, it has a duty cycle of <50%. Here is a pictorial that illustrates these three scenarios:

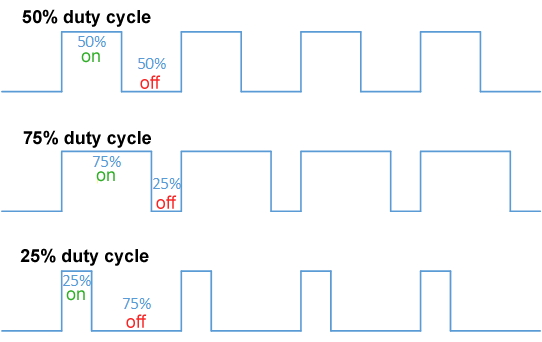

== History ==
The Corliss steam engine was patented in 1849. It used pulse-width modulation to control the intake valve of a steam engine cylinder. A centrifugal governor was used to provide automatic feedback.

Some machines (such as a sewing machine motor) require partial or variable power. In the past, control (such as in a sewing machine's foot pedal) was implemented by use of a rheostat connected in series with the motor to adjust the amount of current flowing through the motor. It was an inefficient scheme, as this also wasted power as heat in the resistor element of the rheostat, but tolerable because the total power was low. While the rheostat was one of several methods of controlling power (see autotransformers and Variac for more info), a low-cost and efficient power switching and adjustment method was yet to be found. This mechanism also needed to be able to drive motors for fans, pumps and robotic servomechanisms, and needed to be compact enough to interface with lamp dimmers. PWM emerged as a solution for this complex problem.

PWM telecommunications systems were invented just prior to the start of World War II, but at that time time-division multiplexing was already in use and there were only experimental PWM systems. This changed with the introduction of the cavity magnetron in 1940, which could produce pulses of microwave frequency energy but could not vary its frequency or precisely control its amplitude. A PWM encoder was used to trigger a magnetron in the British Army's Wireless Set Number 10, which provided long-distance telephone relay, up to 80 kilometres (50 mi).

By 1946, the Philips, N. V. company had designed an optical scanning system for variable area film soundtrack that used PWM while it was scanning the optical audio track transversely with a thin light beam. The electronics then evaluated the threshold between exposed (non-translucent) and unexposed (translucent) parts of the audio track. The proposed system was to reduce noise when playing a film soundtrack.

One early application of PWM was in the Sinclair X10, a 10 W audio amplifier available in kit form in the 1960s. At around the same time, PWM started to be used in AC motor control.

In the mid-1970s, early automotive applications of pulse-width modulation (PWM) were developed in the UK by Associated Engineering Developments Ltd (AED). Engineers Norman Hunt and John Noddings designed systems that used pulse-width modulated electrical signals to control high-speed solenoid valves. By altering the signal's duty cycle, the system could vary hydraulic and pneumatic pressure instead of just turning a solenoid valve fully open or fully closed. This technology was commercialised through AED's subsidiary company, Econocruise Ltd, based in Rugby, Warwickshire. The company used these modulated solenoid valves in pneumatic assemblies to control throttle actuators, supplying cruise control systems for luxury passenger cars and PWM speed limiters for heavy commercial trucks and buses.

Of note, for about a century, some variable-speed electric motors have had decent efficiency, but they were somewhat more complex than constant-speed motors, and sometimes required bulky external electrical apparatus, such as a bank of variable power resistors or rotating converters such as the Ward Leonard drive.

== Principle ==
=== Periodic pulse wave ===
Fig. 1: a periodic pulse wave, showing $y_\text{min}$, $y_\text{max}$ and constant duty cycle D.

If we consider a periodic pulse wave $f(t)$ with period $T$, low value $y_\text{min}$, a high value $y_\text{max}$ and a constant duty cycle D (Figure 1), the average value of the waveform is given by:

$$\bar{y} = \frac{1}{T}\int^T_0f(t)\,dt$$

As $f(t)$ is a pulse wave, its value is $y_\text{max}$ for $0 < t < D \cdot T$ and $y_\text{min}$ for $D \cdot T < t < T$. The above expression then becomes:

$$\begin{align}
\bar{y} &= \frac{1}{T} \left(\int_0^{DT} y_\text{max}\,dt + \int_{DT}^T y_\text{min}\,dt\right)\\
&= \frac{1}{T} \left(D \cdot T \cdot y_\text{max} + T\left(1 - D\right) y_\text{min}\right)\\
&= D\cdot y_\text{max} + \left(1 - D\right) y_\text{min}
\end{align}$$

This latter expression can be fairly simplified in many cases where $y_\text{min} = 0$ as $\bar{y} = D \cdot y_\text{max}$. From this, the average value of the signal ($\bar{y}$) is directly dependent on the duty cycle D.

However, by varying (i.e. modulating) the duty cycle (and possibly also the period), the following more advanced pulse-width modulated waves allow variation of the average value of the waveform.

=== Intersective method PWM ===

The intersective method is a simple way to generate a PWM output signal (magenta in the above figure) with a fixed period and varying duty cycle by using a comparator to switch the PWM output state when the input waveform (red) intersects with a sawtooth or a triangle waveform (blue).

Depending on the type of sawtooth or triangle waveform (green in the figure below), intersective PWM signals (blue in the figure) can be aligned in three ways:

- Leading edge modulation (top plot) uses a reverse sawtooth wave to generate the PWM. The PWM's leading edge is held at the leading edge of the window and the trailing edge is modulated.
- Trailing edge modulation (middle plot) uses a normal sawtooth wave to generate the PWM. The PWM's trailing edge is fixed and the leading edge is modulated.
- Centered pulses (bottom) uses a triangle waveform to generate the PWM. The pulse center is fixed in the center of the time window and both edges of the pulse are moved to compress or expand the width.

==== Time proportioning ====
Many digital circuits can generate PWM signals (e.g., many microcontrollers have PWM outputs). They normally use a counter that increments periodically (it is connected directly or indirectly to the clock of the circuit) and is reset at the end of every period of the PWM. When the counter value is greater than the reference value, the PWM output changes state from high to low (or low to high). This technique is referred to as time proportioning, particularly as time-proportioning control – which proportion of a fixed cycle time is spent in the high state.

The incremented and periodically reset counter is the discrete version of the intersecting method's sawtooth. The analog comparator of the intersecting method becomes a simple integer comparison between the current counter value and the digital (possibly digitized) reference value. The duty cycle can only be varied in discrete steps, as a function of the counter resolution. However, a high-resolution counter can provide quite satisfactory performance.

==== Spectrum ====
The resulting spectra (of the three alignments) are similar. Each contains a DC component, a base sideband containing the modulating signal, and phase-modulated carriers at each harmonic of the frequency of the pulse. The amplitudes of the harmonic groups are restricted by a $\sin x / x$ envelope (sinc function) and extend to infinity. The infinite bandwidth is caused by the nonlinear operation of the pulse-width modulator. In consequence, a digital PWM suffers from aliasing distortion that significantly reduces its applicability for modern communication systems. By limiting the bandwidth of the PWM kernel, aliasing effects can be avoided.

On the contrary, delta modulation and delta-sigma modulation are random processes that produce a continuous spectrum without distinct harmonics. While intersective PWM uses a fixed period but a varying duty cycle, the period of delta and delta-sigma modulated PWMs varies in addition to their duty cycle.

=== Delta modulation ===

Delta modulation produces a PWM signal (magenta in the above figure) which changes state whenever its integral (blue) hits the limits (green) surrounding the input (red).

=== Asynchronous delta-sigma PWM ===

Asynchronous (i.e., unclocked) delta-sigma modulation produces a PWM output (blue in bottom plot) which is subtracted from the input signal (green in top plot) to form an error signal (blue in top plot). This error is integrated (magenta in the middle plot). When the integral of the error exceeds the limits (the upper and lower grey lines in the middle plot), the PWM output changes state. By integrating the difference between the error and the input signal, delta-sigma modulation shapes noise of the resulting spectrum is more concentrated in higher frequencies above the input signal's band.

=== Space vector modulation ===
Space vector modulation is a PWM control algorithm for multi-phase AC generation, in which the reference signal is sampled regularly; after each sample, non-zero active switching vectors adjacent to the reference vector and one or more of the zero switching vectors are selected for the appropriate fraction of the sampling period in order to synthesize the reference signal as the average of the used vectors.

=== Direct torque control (DTC) ===
Direct torque control is a method used to control AC motors. It is closely related to the delta modulation (see above). Motor torque and magnetic flux are estimated and these are controlled to stay within their hysteresis bands by turning on a new combination of the device's semiconductor switches each time either signal tries to deviate out of its band.

== PWM sampling theorem ==
The process of PWM conversion is non-linear, and it is generally supposed that low-pass filter signal recovery is imperfect for PWM. The PWM sampling theorem shows that PWM conversion can be perfect:

Any bandlimited baseband signal whose amplitude is within ±0.637 (2/π) can be represented by a PWM waveform of unit amplitude (±1). The number of pulses in the waveform is equal to the number of Nyquist samples and the peak constraint is independent of whether the waveform is two-level or three-level.

For comparison, the Nyquist–Shannon sampling theorem can be summarized as:

If you have a signal that is bandlimited to a bandwidth of f_{0} then you can collect all the information there is in that signal by sampling it at discrete times, as long as your sample rate is greater than 2f_{0}.

== PWM controllers ==
In electronics, many modern microcontrollers (MCUs) integrate PWM controllers exposed to external pins as peripheral devices under firmware control. These are commonly used for direct current (DC) motor control in robotics, switched-mode power supply regulation, and other applications.

The type of PWM controller found in MCUs is based on a digital counter. In the basic output mode, the counter is compared against a threshold level to determine whether a signal should be output. As a result, the threshold level determines the duty cycle. (This is a digital version of the intersective method from above.) Some PWMs include a way to control the period/frequency, either a configurable clock divider or a "prescaling" counter.

Many PWM controllers are also input devices: they can measure the characteristics (frequency, duty cycle) of an input PWM signal using their inbuilt counters and triggers that fire at the falling or rising edge of the input signal. Using two edges of the same type produces the frequency/period; using two edge measurements of different types produces the on or off duration, which, when divided by period, produces the duty cycle.

== Applications ==
=== Servo and motors ===
PWM is used to control servomechanisms; see servo control.

The PWM output of a microcontroller is almost never used to directly drive a motor. Instead, this signal is interpreted by a motor controller, which converts it into a more accurate PWM signal for the motor. This kind of "PWM controller" used in robotics is derived from PWM controllers used in hobby radio control vehicles.

=== Telecommunications ===
In telecommunications, PWM is a form of signal modulation where the widths of the pulses correspond to specific data values encoded at one end and decoded at the other.

Pulses of various lengths (the information itself) will be sent at regular intervals (the carrier frequency of the modulation).

          _      _      _      _      _      _      _      _     
Clock    | |    | |    | |    | |    | |    | |    | |    | |    
       __| |____| |____| |____| |____| |____| |____| |____| |____

                 _      __     ____          ____   _
PWM signal      | |    |  |   |    |        |    | | |
       _________| |____|  |___|    |________|    |_| |___________

Data       0     1       2      4      0      4     1      0

The inclusion of a clock signal is not necessary, as the leading edge of the data signal can be used as the clock if a small offset is added to each data value to avoid a data value with a zero-length pulse.

                _      __     ___    _____   _      _____   __     _   
PWM signal     | |    |  |   |   |  |     | | |    |     | |  |   | |  
             __| |____|  |___|   |__|     |_| |____|     |_|  |___| |_____

Data            0       1      2       4     0        4      1     0

=== Power delivery ===
PWM can be used to control the amount of power delivered to a load without incurring the losses that would result from linear power delivery by resistive means. Drawbacks to this technique are that the power drawn by the load is not constant but rather discontinuous (see Buck converter), and energy delivered to the load is not continuous either. However, the load may be inductive, and with a sufficiently high frequency and, when necessary, using additional passive electronic filters, the pulse train can be smoothed and an average analog waveform recovered. Power flow into the load can be continuous. Power flow from the supply is not constant and will require energy storage on the supply side in most cases. (In the case of an electrical circuit, a capacitor to absorb energy stored in (often parasitic) supply side inductance.)

High frequency PWM power control systems are easily realisable with semiconductor switches. As explained above, almost no power is dissipated by the switch in either on or off state. However, during the transitions between on and off states, both voltage and current are nonzero and thus power is dissipated in the switches. By quickly changing the state between fully on and fully off (typically less than 100 nanoseconds), the power dissipation in the switches can be quite low compared to the power being delivered to the load.

Modern semiconductor switches such as MOSFETs or insulated-gate bipolar transistors (IGBTs) are well-suited components for high-efficiency controllers. Frequency converters used to control AC motors may have efficiencies exceeding 98%. Switching power supplies have lower efficiency due to low output voltage levels (often even less than 2 V for microprocessors are needed), but still more than 70–80% efficiency can be achieved.

Variable-speed computer fan controllers usually use PWM, as it is far more efficient when compared to a potentiometer or rheostat. (Neither of the latter is practical to operate electronically; they would require a small drive motor.)

Light dimmers for home use employ a specific type of PWM control. Home-use light dimmers typically include electronic circuitry that suppresses current flow during defined portions of each cycle of the AC line voltage. Adjusting the brightness of light emitted by a light source is then merely a matter of setting at what voltage (or phase) in the AC half-cycle the dimmer begins to provide electric current to the light source (e.g. by using an electronic switch such as a triac). In this case, the PWM duty cycle is the ratio of the conduction time to the duration of the half AC cycle defined by the frequency of the AC line voltage (50 or 60 Hz, depending on the country).

These rather simple types of dimmers can be effectively used with inert (or relatively slow reacting) light sources such as incandescent lamps, for example, for which the additional modulation in supplied electrical energy, which is caused by the dimmer, causes only negligible additional fluctuations in the emitted light. Some other types of light sources, such as light-emitting diodes (LEDs), however, turn on and off extremely rapidly and would perceivably flicker if supplied with low-frequency drive voltages. Perceivable flicker effects from such rapid-response light sources can be reduced by increasing the PWM frequency. If the light fluctuations are sufficiently rapid (faster than the flicker fusion threshold), the human visual system can no longer resolve them, and the eye perceives the time-averaged intensity without flicker.

In electric cookers, continuously variable power is applied to the heating elements, such as the hob or the grill, using a device known as a simmerstat. This consists of a thermal oscillator running at approximately two cycles per minute, and the mechanism varies the duty cycle according to the knob setting. The thermal time constant of the heating elements is several minutes, so that the temperature fluctuations are too small to matter in practice.

==== Voltage regulation ====
PWM is also used in efficient voltage regulators. By switching the voltage to the load with the appropriate duty cycle, the output will approximate a voltage at the desired level. The switching noise is usually filtered with an inductor and a capacitor.

One method measures the output voltage. When it is lower than the desired voltage, it turns on the switch. When the output voltage is above the desired voltage, it turns off the switch.

==== Soft-blinking LED indicator ====
PWM techniques would typically be used to make some indicator (like an LED) soft blink. The light will slowly go from dark to full intensity, and then slowly dim to dark again. Then it repeats. The period would be several soft blinks per second, up to several seconds for one blink. An indicator of this type would not disturb as much as a hard-blinking on/off indicator. The indicator lamp on the Apple iBook G4, PowerBook 6,7 (2005) was of this type. This kind of indicator is also called pulsing glow, as opposed to calling it flashing.

=== Audio effects and amplification ===
Varying the duty cycle of a pulse waveform in a synthesis instrument creates useful timbral variations. Some synthesizers have a duty-cycle trimmer for their square-wave outputs, and that trimmer can be set by ear; the 50% point (true square wave) is distinctive because even-numbered harmonics essentially disappear at 50%. Pulse waves, usually 50%, 25%, and 12.5%, make up the soundtracks of classic video games. The term PWM, as used in sound (music) synthesis, refers to the ratio between the high and low levels being secondarily modulated with a low-frequency oscillator. This gives a sound effect similar to chorus or slightly detuned oscillators played together. (In fact, PWM is equivalent to the sum of two sawtooth waves with one of them inverted.)

Class-D amplifiers produce a PWM equivalent of a lower-frequency input signal that can be sent to a loudspeaker via a suitable filter network to block the carrier and recover the original lower-frequency signal. Since they switch power directly from the high supply rail and low supply rail, these amplifiers have efficiency above 90% and can be relatively compact and light, even for large power outputs. For a few decades, industrial and military PWM amplifiers have been in common use, often for driving servomotors. Field-gradient coils in MRI machines are driven by relatively high-power PWM amplifiers.

Historically, a crude form of PWM has been used to play back PCM digital sound on the PC speaker, which is driven by only two voltage levels, typically 0 and 5 V. By carefully timing the duration of the pulses, and by relying on the speaker's physical filtering properties (limited frequency response, self-inductance, etc.), it was possible to obtain an approximate playback of mono PCM samples, although at a very low quality, and with greatly varying results between implementations. The Sega 32X uses PWM to play sample-based sound in its games.

In more recent times, the Direct Stream Digital sound encoding method was introduced, which uses a generalized form of pulse-width modulation called pulse-density modulation, at a high enough sampling rate (typically in the order of MHz) to cover the whole acoustic frequency range with sufficient fidelity. This method is used in the SACD format, and reproduction of the encoded audio signal is essentially similar to the method used in class-D amplifiers.

=== Electrical ===
SPWM (sine–triangle pulse-width modulation) signals are used in solar inverter design. These switching signals are fed to the FETs that are used in the device. The device's efficiency depends on the harmonic content of the PWM signal. There is much research on eliminating unwanted harmonics and improving the fundamental strength, some of which involves using a modified carrier signal instead of a classic sawtooth signal in order to decrease power losses and improve efficiency. Another common application is in robotics where PWM signals are used to control the speed of the robot by controlling the motors.

== See also ==
- Analog signal to discrete time interval converter
- Class-D amplifier
- Computer fan control
- Continuously variable slope delta modulation
- Delta-sigma modulation
- H-bridge
- Pulse-amplitude modulation
- Pulse-code modulation
- Pulse-density modulation
- Pulse-frequency modulation
- Pulse-position modulation
- Radio control
- Random pulse-width modulation
- RC servo
- Sliding mode control - produces smooth behavior by way of discontinuous switching in systems
- Space vector modulation
- Sound chip
