= Switching frequency =

Functional parameter of electronic systems

In electronics, switching frequency refers to the rate at which an electronic switch performs its function. Switching frequency is an important design and operating parameter in systems such as:

- The Class-D amplifier, an audio power amplifier with a switched-mode output.
- Various types of electric power conversion equipment:
  - Boost converter
  - Buck–boost converter
  - Buck converter
  - Chopper
  - Switched-mode power supply
  - Power inverter
- Motor controls, such as Variable-frequency drives

This frequency is also used in different types of DC-DC converters like Battery Discharge Regulator, Universal Bus Regulator, Auxiliary Bus Regulator etc., switching frequency refers the switch on or off the circuit in the particular frequency
