= Electrostatic discharge materials =

Plastics that reduce static electricity

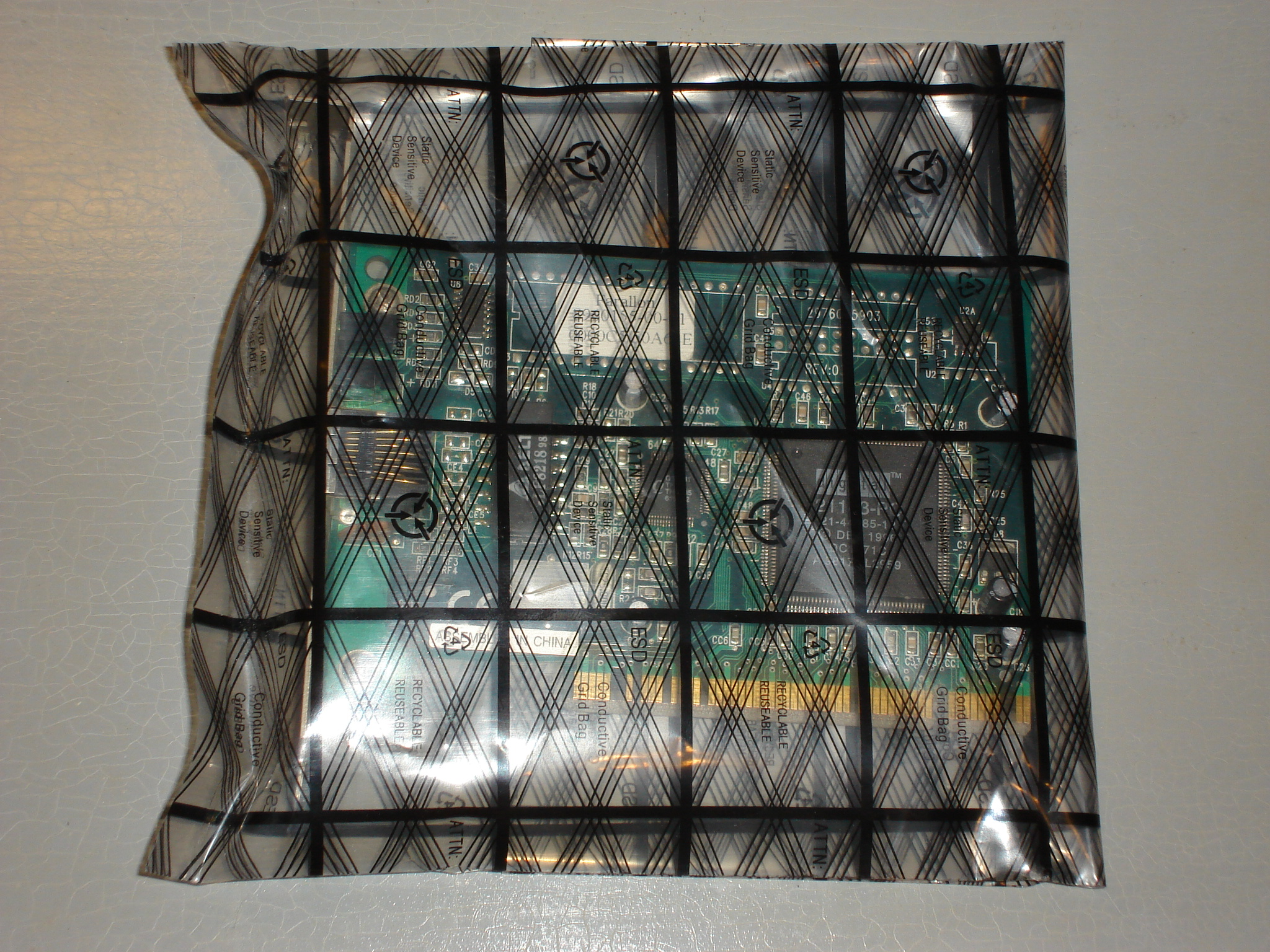
Conductive ESD bag with a network card inside

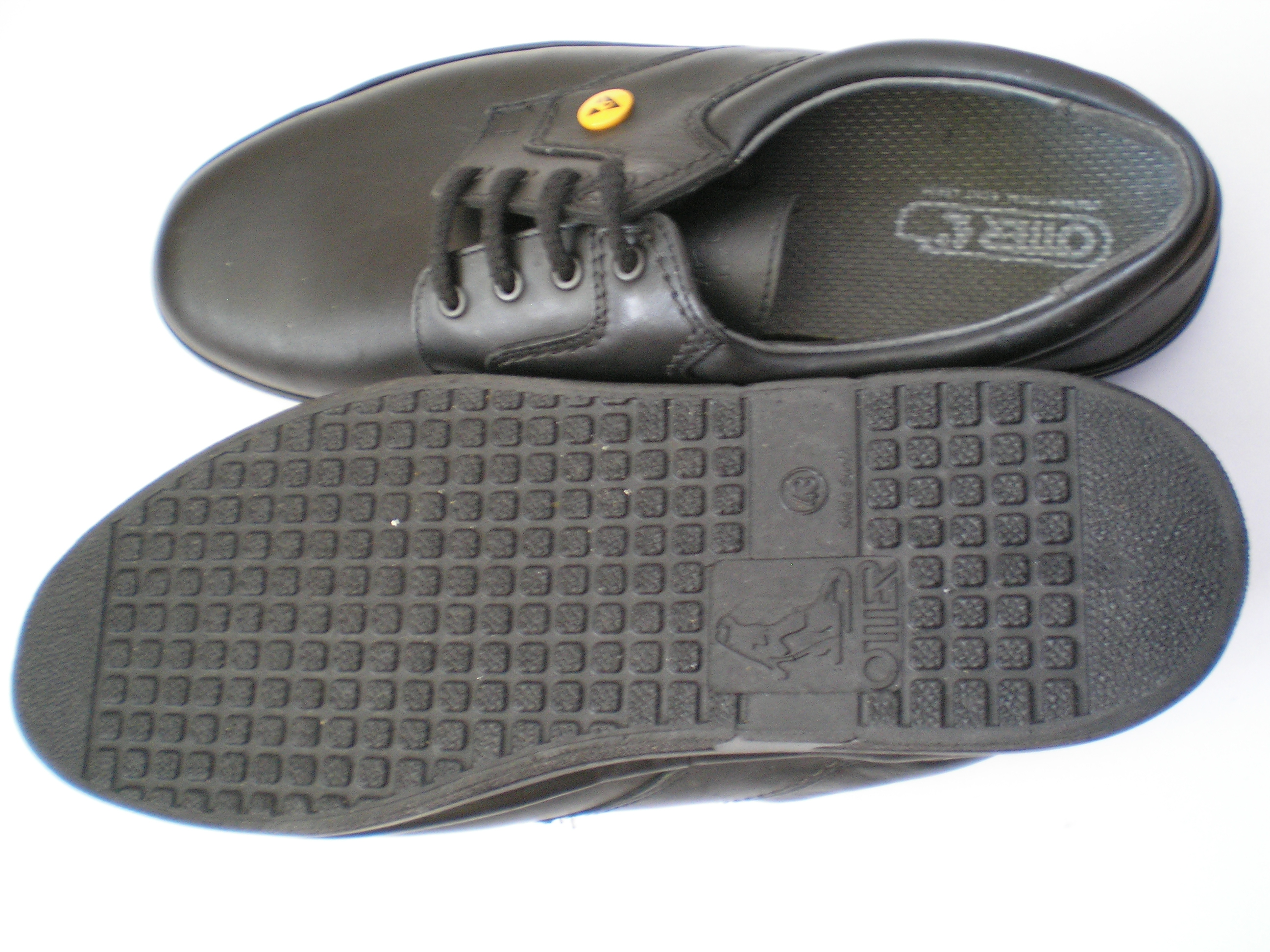
ESD shoes with carbonized rubber (weakly conductive) bottom

Electrostatic discharge materials (ESD materials) are plastics that reduce static electricity to protect against damage to electrostatic-sensitive devices (ESD) or to prevent the accidental ignition of flammable liquids or gases.

== Materials ==
The properties relevant to a material in an ESD context are:

- Conductivity: how well it passes electricity. When dealing in thin sheets, sheet resistance is used, describing the resistance of a square of the material for a current flowing from one edge to the opposite edge. The value is depends on the thickness of the material.
- Antistatic: whether rubbing can cause dangerous electrostatic buildup (> 1000 V) on the material via triboelectric effect.
- Static-dissipation: whether any existing static charge can be gradually removed by conducting through the material.
- Shielding: whether the electromagnetic field due to an electrostatic discharge from the outside results in a non-dangerous amount of voltage on the inside.
- Isolation: whether the two sides of the material are electrically isolated enough, so that any discharge that happens across the material is weak enough.

Material	Ohms per square	Shielding	Antistatic	Dissipation	Isolation	Purpose
Metals	< 10^{−3}	Yes	Yes	Too fast	No	Used as shielding layer in some moisture-barrier laminates (ESD bag).
Metalized film	10^{−1} to 10^{2}	Yes	Yes	Too fast	Yes	Used as part of shielding laminates and some moisture-barrier laminates (ESD bag). Always appears silvery-translucent.
Carbons (graphite powders and fiber)	1 to 10^{3}	Yes	Yes	Too fast	No	Not used in pure form as it generates powder easily. May be incorporated into composite materials.
Conductive plastic (carbon-loaded)	10^{3} to 10^{5}	30%	Yes	Yes	Low	Used as a film to make ESD bags. Also used to make solid plastic pieces (e.g. boxes), foam, and bubble-wrap. Always appears opaque black. Carbon-loaded elastomers such as rubber and Ethylene-vinyl acetate are also used.
Dissipative plastic	10^{7} to 10^{11}	< 10%	Yes	Yes	Yes	Used as a film to make ESD bags. Also used as a part of shielding laminates. Also used to make foam and bubble-wrap. Typically translucent pink due to added coloring.
Insulators and base polymers	> 10^{13}	No	No	No	Yes	Not an ESD material: charges will build up.

== See also ==
- Antistatic device
- Electrostatic discharge
- Electrical resistivity and conductivity
- Velostat
