= Antistatic bag =

Type of packaging for electronics and static-sensitive devices

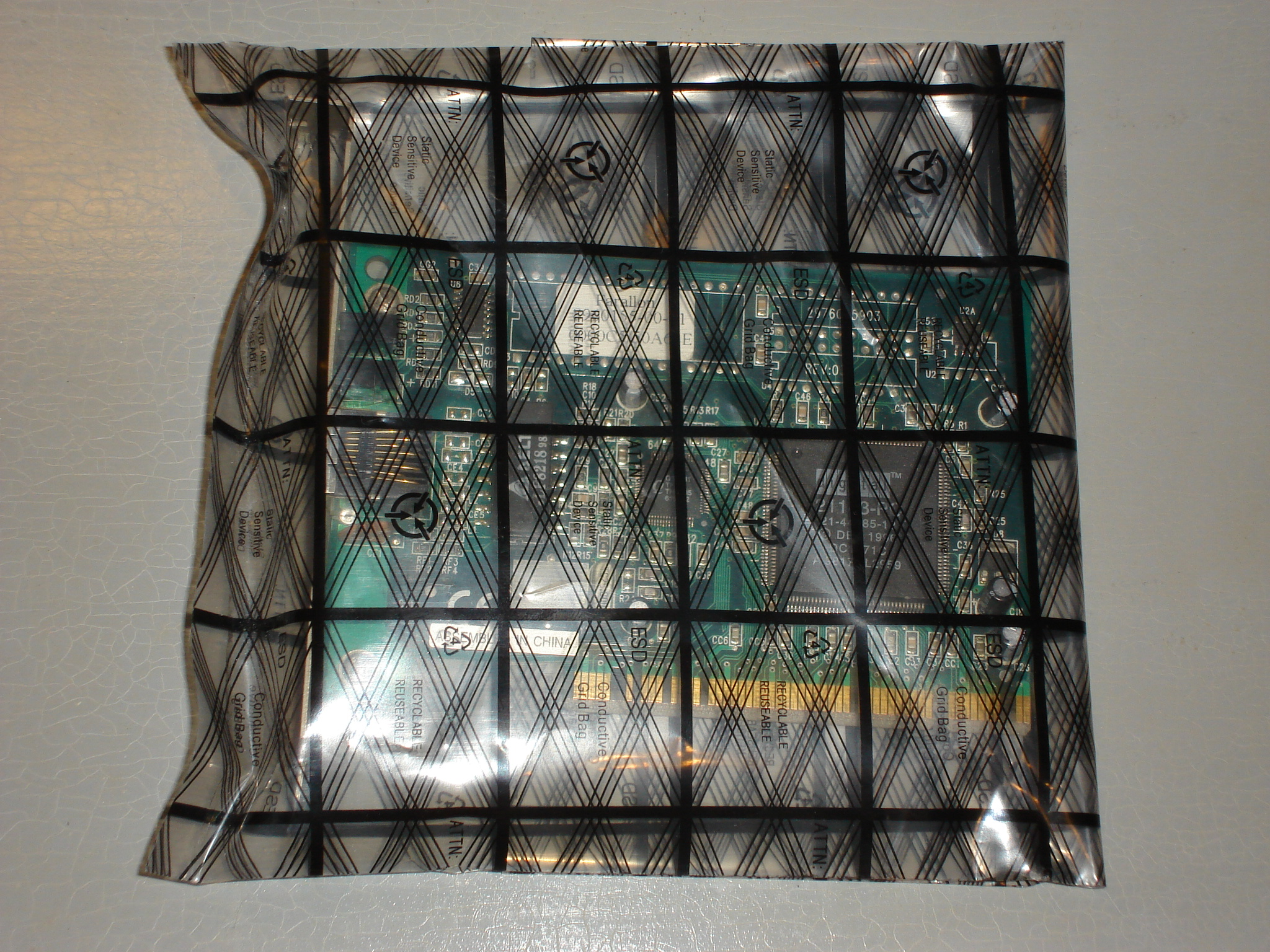
A network card inside an antistatic bag.

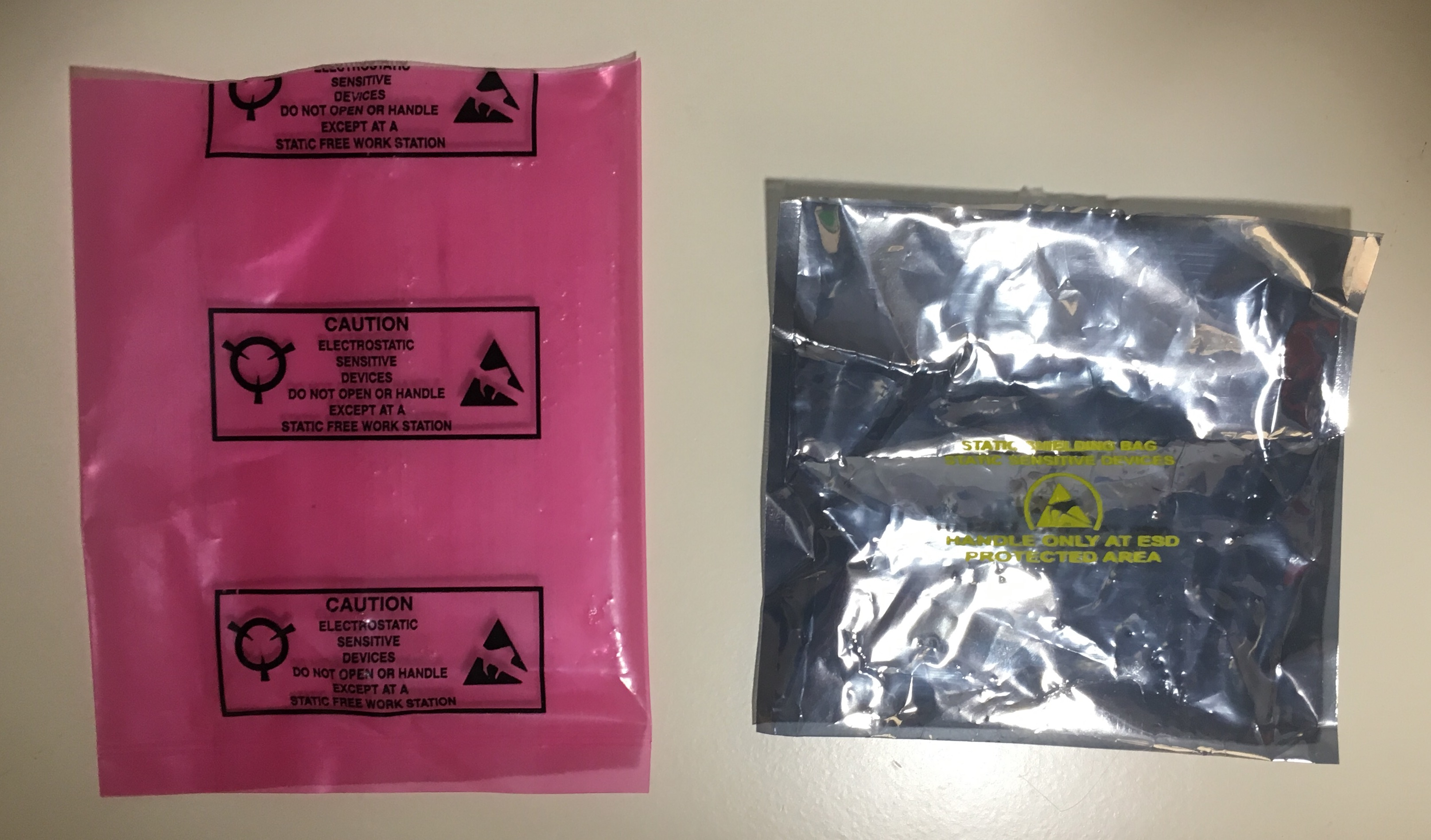
A pink static dissipative bag, and a silver conductive bag. Note the two recurring ESD symbols

ESD-protective packaging is used for storing electronic components, which are prone to damage caused by electrostatic discharge (ESD). They generally are in the form of a bag, hence the colloquial name ESD bag. They generally have a layer of weakly conductive material on the inside to prevent static charges from building up from rubbing (triboelectric effect) and to make sure any static discharge flows through the bag and not the contents. The former property is called being antistatic; the latter is called being static-dissipative. According to JESD 625-A, a material being conductive does not imply that it will be antistatic; specialized triboelectric tests must be performed to make sure.

Some ESD packaging incorporate a higher-conductivity layer to form a Faraday cage. This not only provides protection against electrostatic discharge, but also external electric fields. This protection is relevant if a static discharge happens between the outside of the bag and another object (such as a person's hand), as the ensuing electrostatic field will penetrate a non-conductive bag and generate a voltage on the inside of the bag. ANSI/ESD S541 Appendix E defines a static shielding test, which applies a discharge to the outside of the bag. A voltage sensor is placed inside the bag to understand how well the bag shields.

Standards that describe ESD-protective packaging include JESD 625-A (formerly EIA 625), ANSI/ESD S541 (formerly EIA 541), and ANSI/ESD S20.20. ANSI/ESD S541 defines a few ways to test ESD packaging.

== Construction ==
Most ESD packaging are mainly made out of plastic (commonly polyethylene terephthalate [PET] or polyethylene [PE]) as plastic is cheap, flexible, and harder to tear compared to foil. However, since most plastic is not conductive, special treatment must be done to make them ESD-protective.

Dissipative "pink poly" bag
This kind of bag is made out of PE with a very weakly conductive chemical either mixed into the plastic or coated onto it. They are both antistatic and static-dissipative, but provide very little shielding: a discharge that would generate a 1000 V pulse on the inside of a regular plastic bag would manifest as a 800 V pulse on the inside of a "pink" bag.
"Pink bags" are mainly used to package material that are themselves ESD-resistant but are placed in proximity to ESD-susceptible devices. They are called "type II" in MIL-B-81705. The pink color is added to the plastic using a coloring chemical. The conductive chemical itself has no color and clear versions of this bag exist.
These types of bags were manufactured using reactive tallow amine in the past. The amine attracts moisture that can conduct the charge to another surface, or to the atmosphere itself. However, it can cause oxidation of some metals and stress cracking in some plastics. Less-reactive amines and non-reactive amides have replaced tallow amine in modern bags.
Semi-conductive "black poly" bag
This kind of bag is made out of carbon-loaded PE, making it much more conductive than the "pink" bag. As a result, it provides a little more shielding capacity (reducing a 1000 V pulse to 600 V) while also being antistatic and static-dissipative. However, this also means that it provides no electrical isolation between the inside and the outside, so it is also possible for it to act as a "bridge" for a discharge between the content and the outside environment.
This type of bag are black and not transparent. This represents a new risk as handlers may damage the contents via static discharge when opening the bag to examine the contents. Its price approaches the pink bag while offering a little bit of shielding, making it an intermediate choice when real shielding bags were expensive.
Shield bag (silvery translucent)
This kind of bag uses a multi-layer laminate design. Four layers are generally used, with two layers of dissipative PE (as described above) sandwiching a metallised film (usually polyester). The metal on the film can be facing the inside or the outside. The plastic part of the metallised film acts as a dielectric to isolate the content electrically while the metal part forms a Faraday cage to shield against electric fields. The shielding bag is antistatic, static-dissipative, and very well-shielded, reducing a 1000 V pulse to 20 V.
Shielding bags appear silvery and are translucent. These bags are preferred for more sensitive parts, but they also see use in environments where sparks would be hazardous, such as oxygen-rich areas in aircraft and hospitals. The downsides include their cost and relative fragility, as any puncture compromises the integrity of the shield. In addition, they have a limited shelf life as the metal substrate can deteriorate over time.
Moisture-barrier bag
This kind of bag is very similar to the shielding bag, except that it includes at least one layer of vapor barrier in the multi-layer material. Two types of this bag exist: one is made from an aluminum foil with dissipative tyvek on the outside and dissipative PE on the inside; the other is made from two layers of metallised film with an antistatic coating in the outside and dissipative PE on the inside. They provide all protections that a standard shielding barrier provides as well as stronger protection against the passage of moisture.
Moisture-barrier bags are thicker than regular shielding bags. As a result, they are tougher.

Both pink (dissipative) and black (conductive) polyethlene also exist in other forms, such as foam, bubble wrap, and rigid pieces such as boxes. The foam is used for storing individual leaded components by piercing the leads into the foam.

== Use ==
Multiple layers of protection are often used to protect from both mechanical damage and electrostatic damage. A protected device can be packaged inside a metalized PET film bag, inside a pink polyethylene bubble-wrap bag, which is finally packed inside a rigid black polyethylene box lined with pink poly foam.

It is important that the bags only be opened at static-free workstations.

== See also ==
- Antistatic device
  - Antistatic garments
  - Antistatic agent
  - Antistatic mat
  - Antistatic wrist strap
- Electromagnetic shielding
- Electrostatic sensitive device
- Velostat
