= Snap fastener =

Two-part snap-together fastener

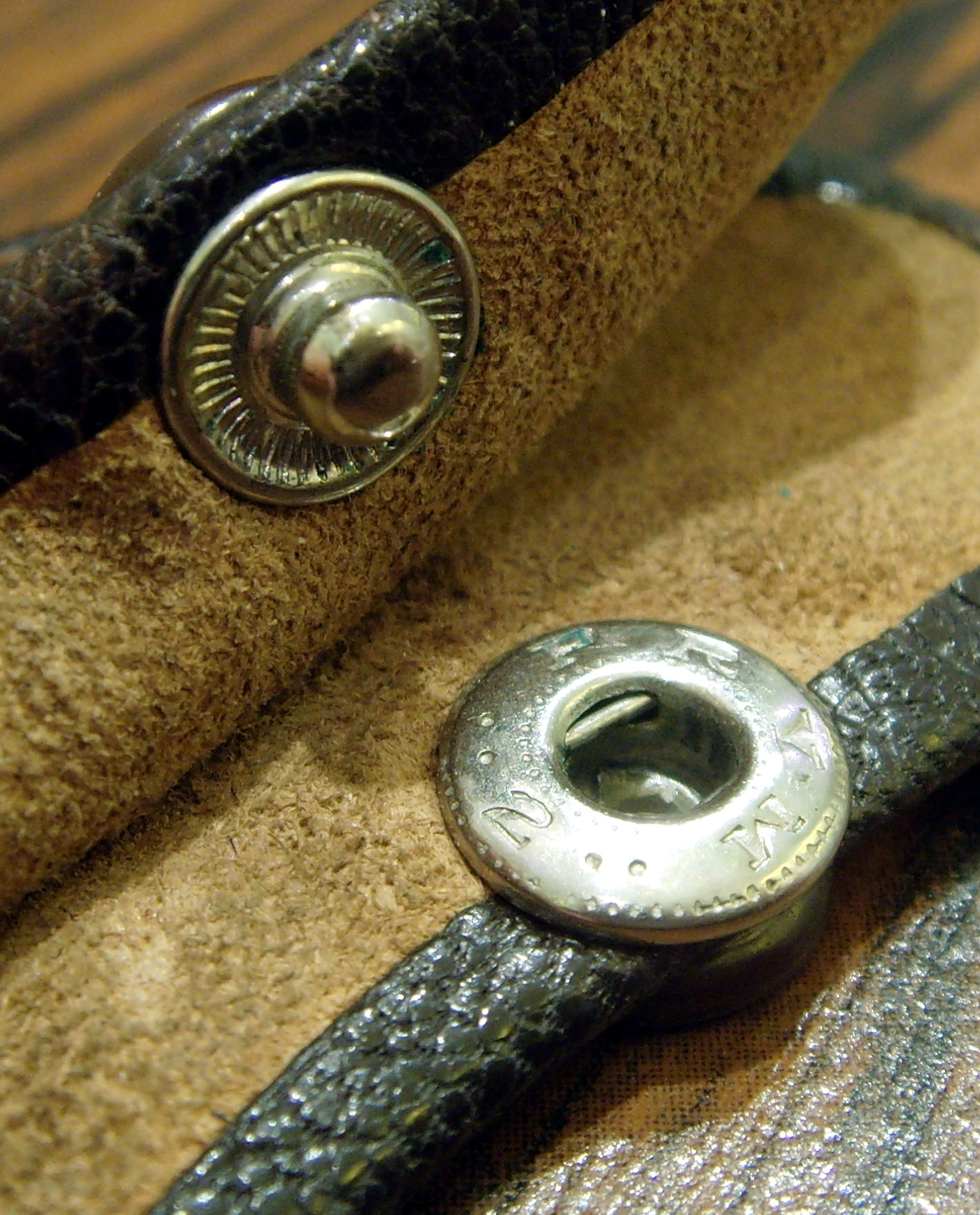
The two halves of a riveted leather snap fastener. The top half has a groove which "snaps" in place when "pressed" into the bottom half.

A snap fastener, also called a snap, snap button, press button, press stud, press fastener, dome fastener, popper, tich, or tich button, is a pair of interlocking discs, made out of a metal or plastic, commonly used in place of traditional buttons to fasten clothing and for similar purposes. A circular lip under one disc fits into a groove on the top of the other, holding them fast until a certain amount of force is applied. Different types of snaps can be attached to fabric or leather by riveting with a punch and die set specific to the type of rivet snaps used (striking the punch with a hammer to splay the tail), sewing, or plying with special snap pliers.

Snap fasteners are a noted detail in American Western wear and were also often chosen for children's clothing, as they are relatively easy for children to use compared with traditional buttons.

== Invention ==
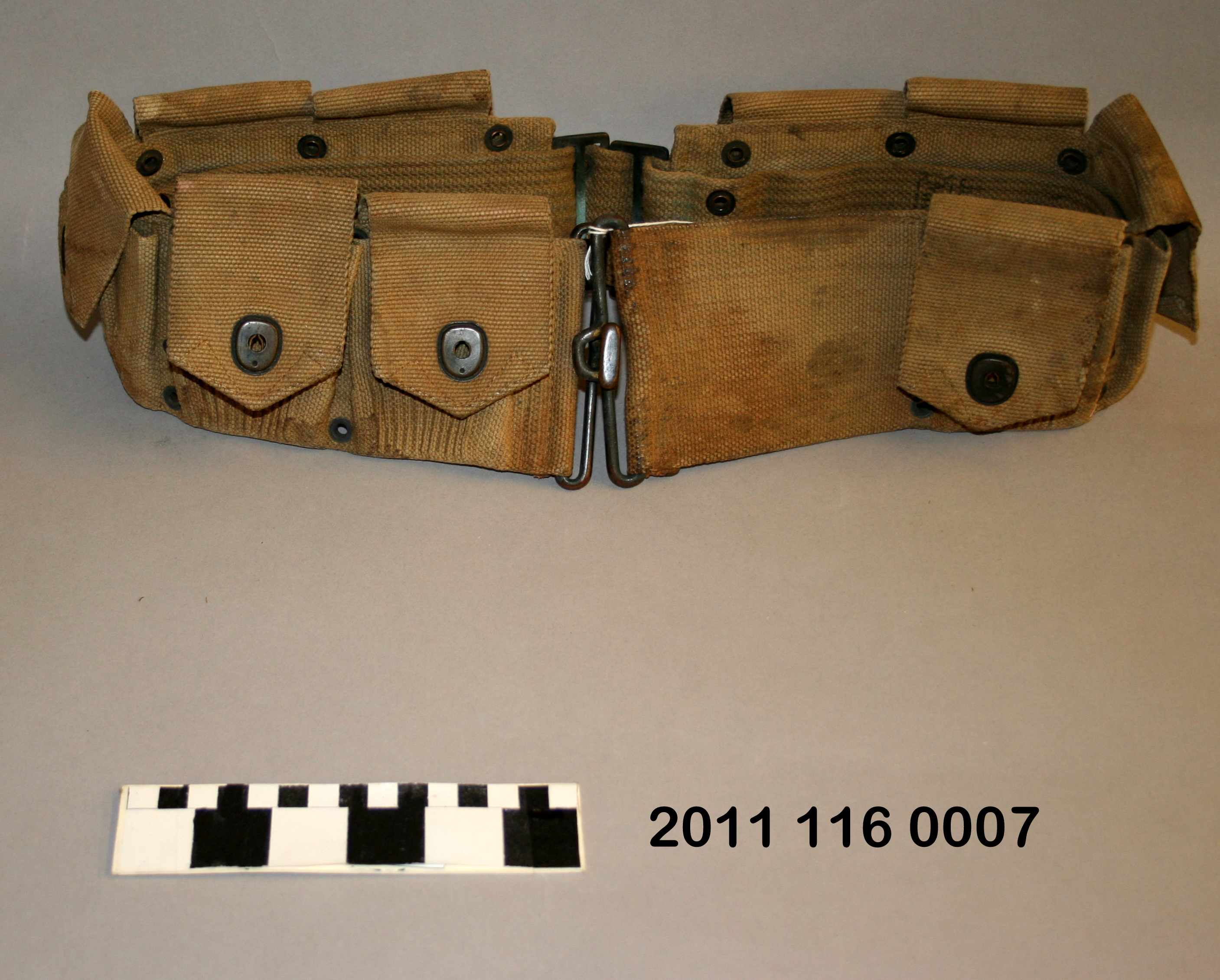
US M1910 ammunition belt with "Lift-The-Dot®" type snap fasteners designed to lock securely on three sides and release manually from only one specific direction

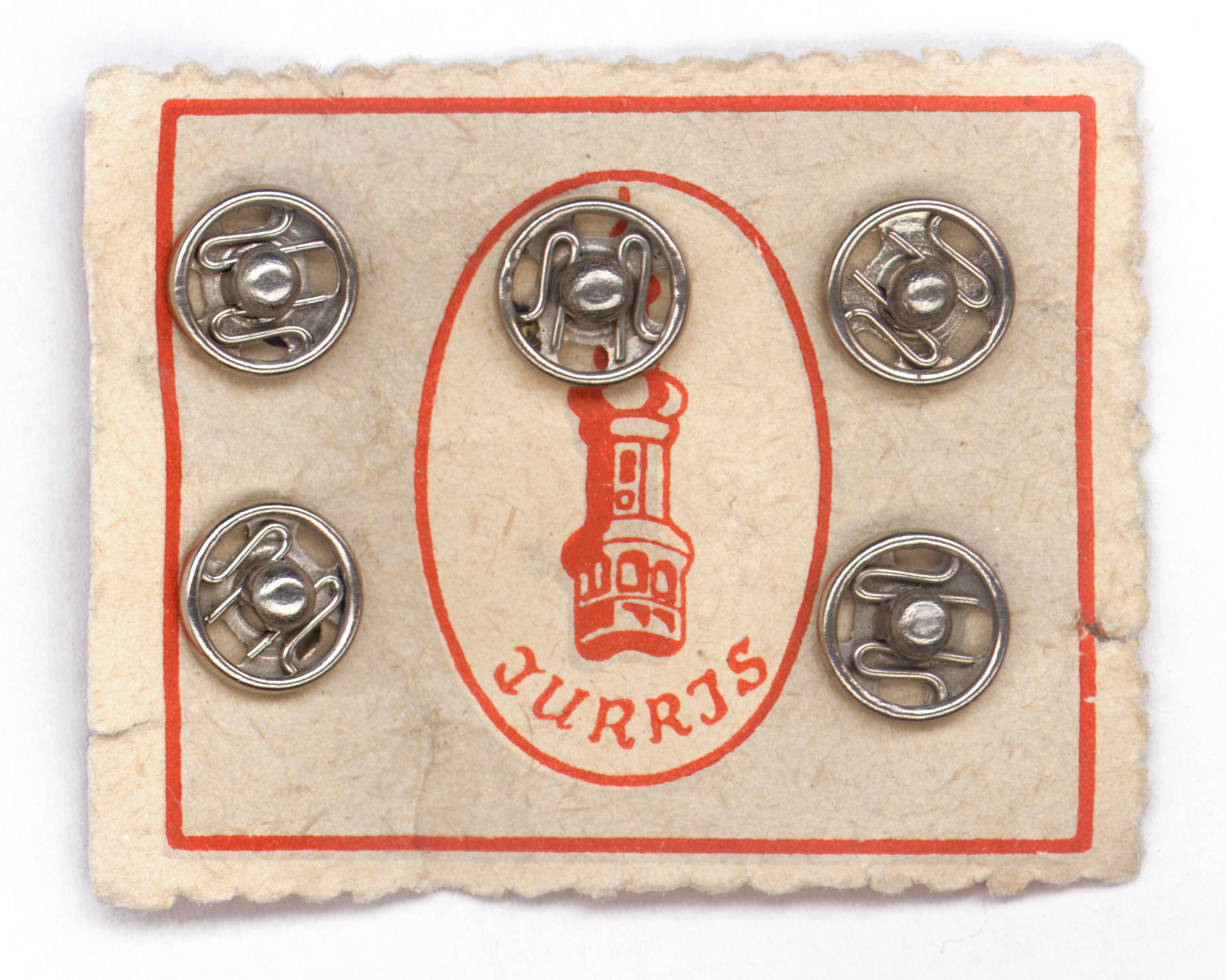
Tich buttons for dresses (1968)

A modern form of the snap fastener was patented by German inventor Heribert Bauer in 1885 as the "Federknopf-Verschluss", a novelty fastener for men's trousers. Some attribute the invention to Bertel Sanders of Denmark. In 1886, Albert-Pierre Raymond, of Grenoble, also obtained a patent. These early versions had an S-shaped spring in the "male" disc instead of a groove. Australian inventor Myra Juliet Farrell is also credited with inventing a "stitchless press stud" and the "stitchless hook and eye". In the United States, Jack Weil (1901–2008) put snaps on his iconic Western shirts, helping to popularize them in Western wear. The Prym company has produced snap fasteners since 1903.

== Use ==
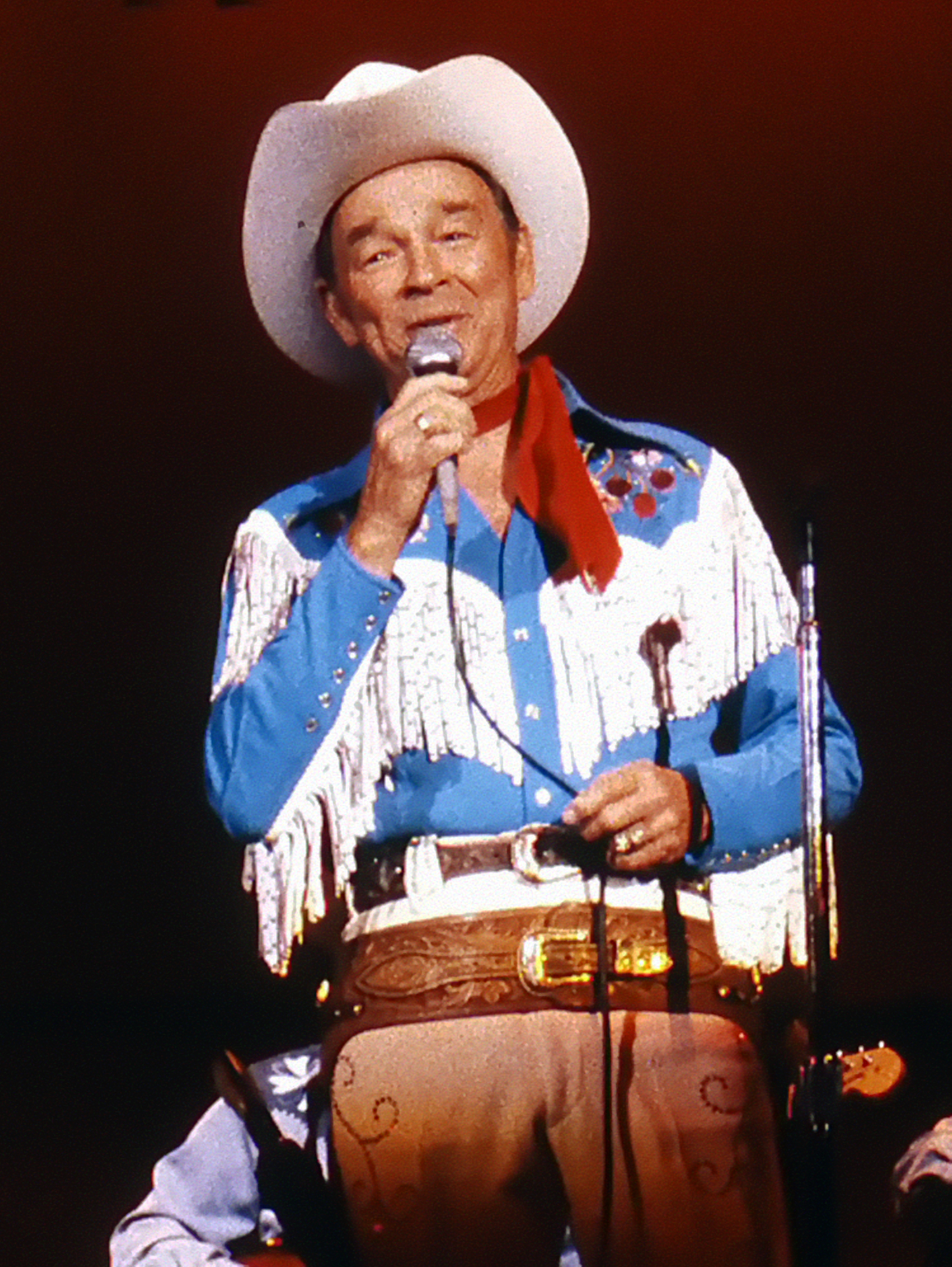
Iconic cowboy singer and actor Roy Rogers wearing Western shirt with faux pearl snaps

Snaps were incorporated into military equipment because of their speed of use, comparative freedom from snagging, and ease of disentanglement when caught. They were particularly suited to paratroop equipment because of the danger of snagging on the myriad lines attaching a parachute canopy. The Denison smock, for example, was fitted with "Newey" snap fasteners. Hook-and-loop fasteners have also been widely used in military equipment as closures for clothing and equipage.

A specialized form of snap fastener is the "Lift-the-DOT" fastener, developed and manufactured by Scovill. It is a directional fastener that locks on three sides and opens only when the side marked "DOT" is lifted. It has been used with heavy materials such as vehicle roofs and on U.S. military webbing equipment during the World War I and World War II eras. It has also been used in applications including automobile and marine equipment, luggage, and tents and awnings. A related design, the "Pull-the-DOT" fastener, also locks on three sides but is released by pulling the side bearing its trademark upward. Both types conform to US Government MIL-10884 specifications.

Snaps were also adopted for use with law enforcement holsters and their accessories, where their quick operation and resistance to snagging were useful.

Press studs were adopted by rodeo cowboys from the 1930s onward because they could be quickly undone if, in the event of a fall, a shirt became snagged on the saddle. Faux pearl snaps entered American mainstream Western wear fashion during the 1950s, when singing cowboys such as Gene Autry and Roy Rogers incorporated them into their embroidered and fringed stage shirts.

== Gallery ==
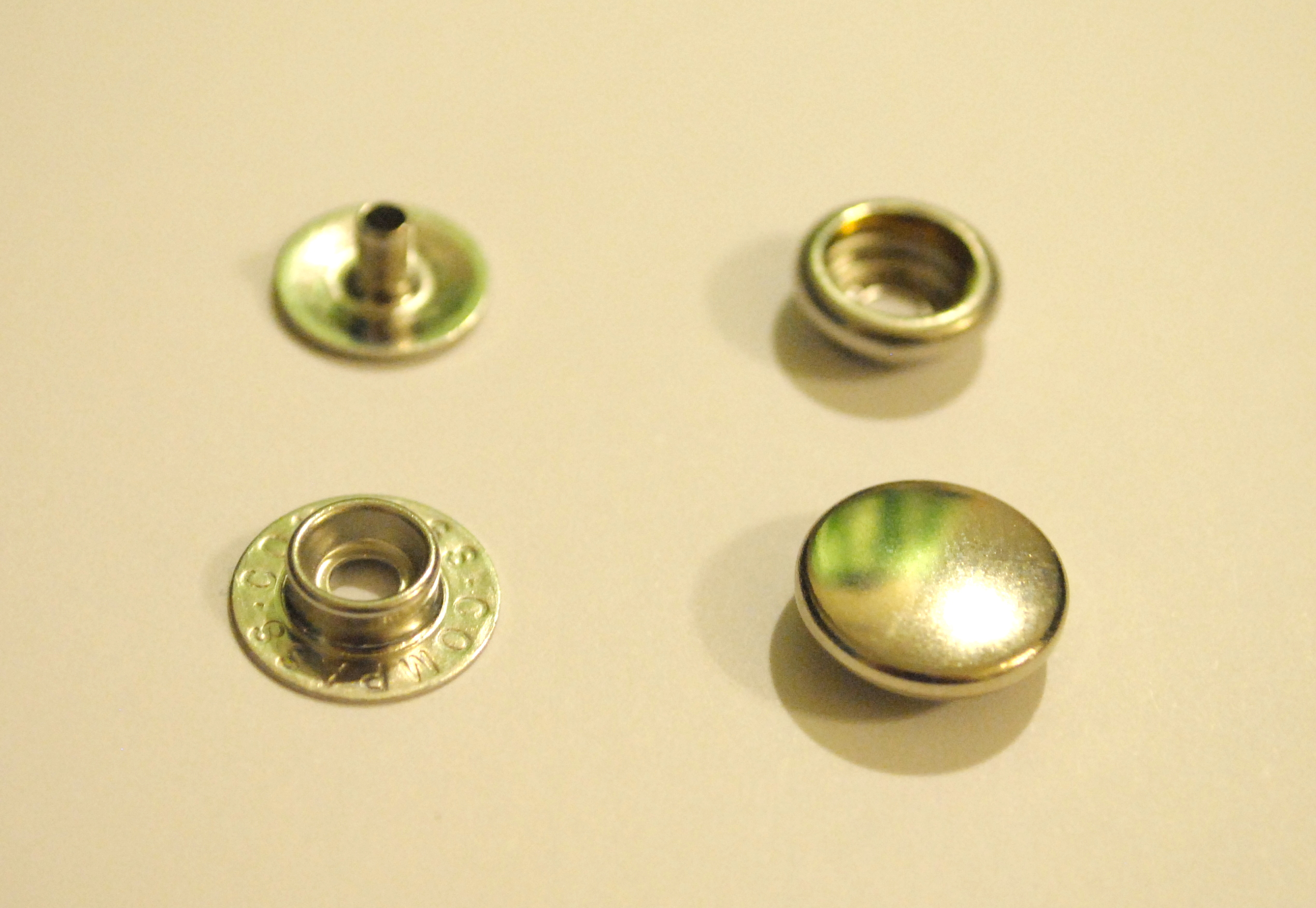
Four pieces of a typical rivet snap fastener: from upper left, the "eyelet" "socket", "cap", and "stud"

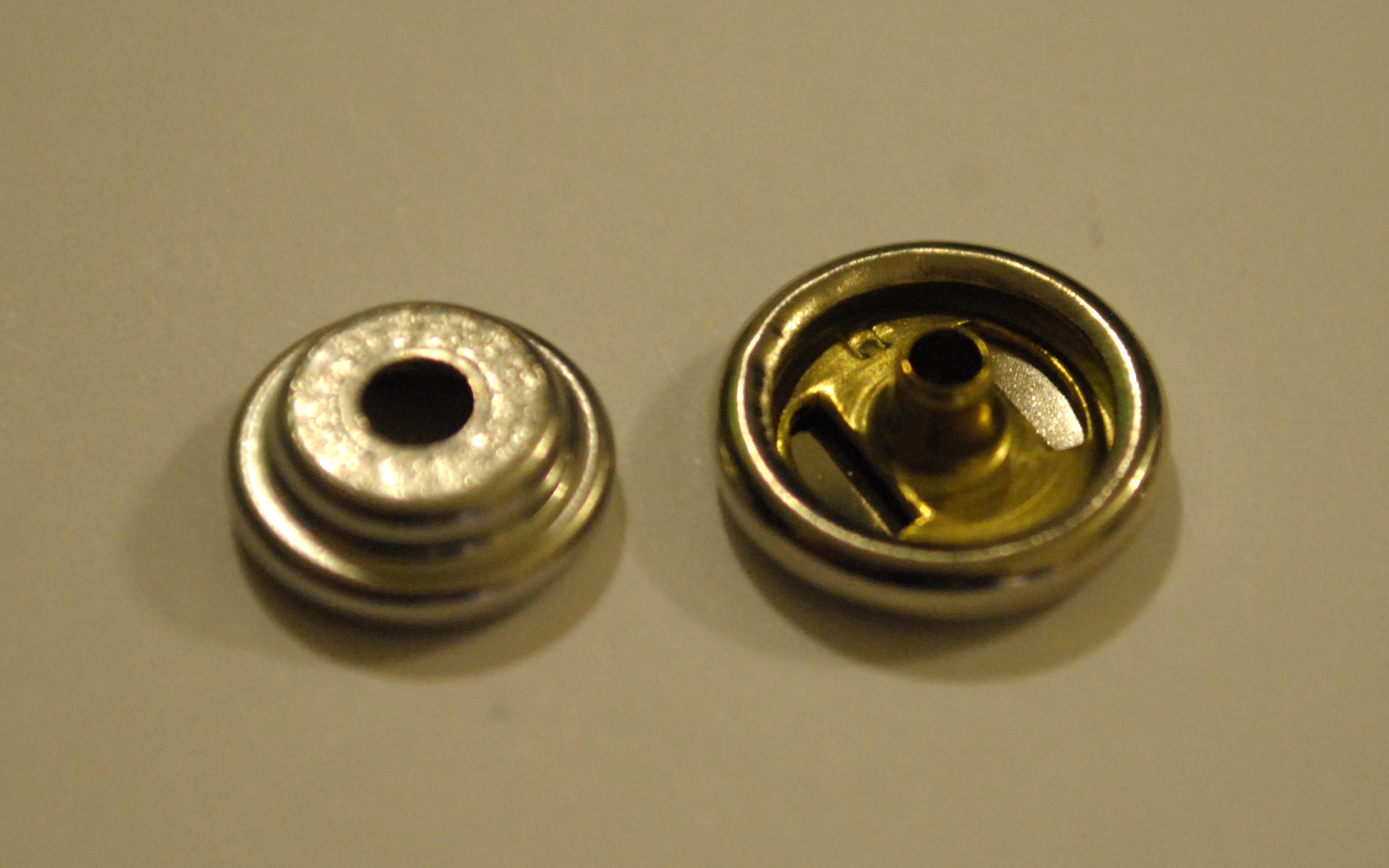
The socket and cap, the "female" parts of a riveted snap fastener

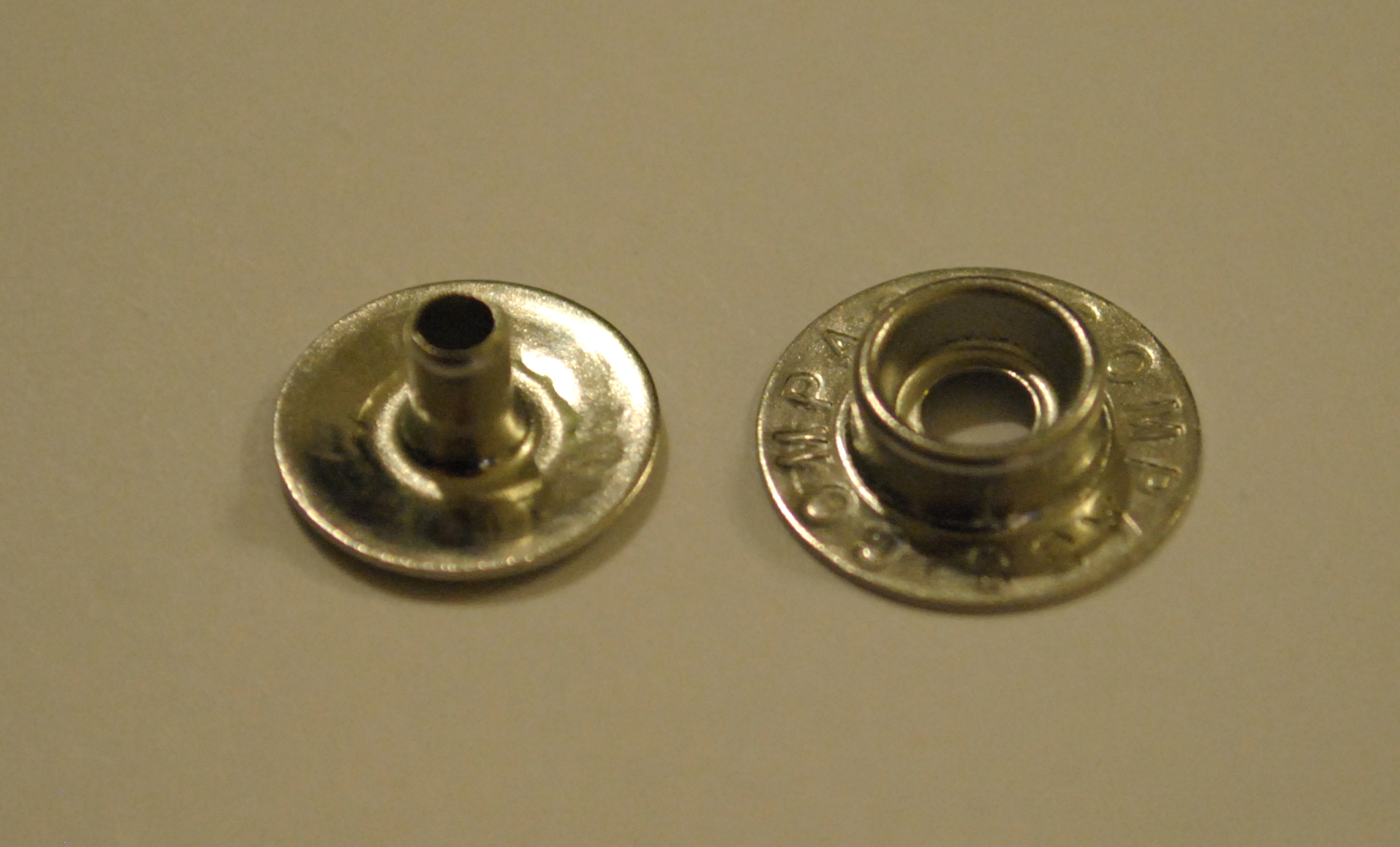
The eyelet and stud, the "male" parts of a riveted snap fastener

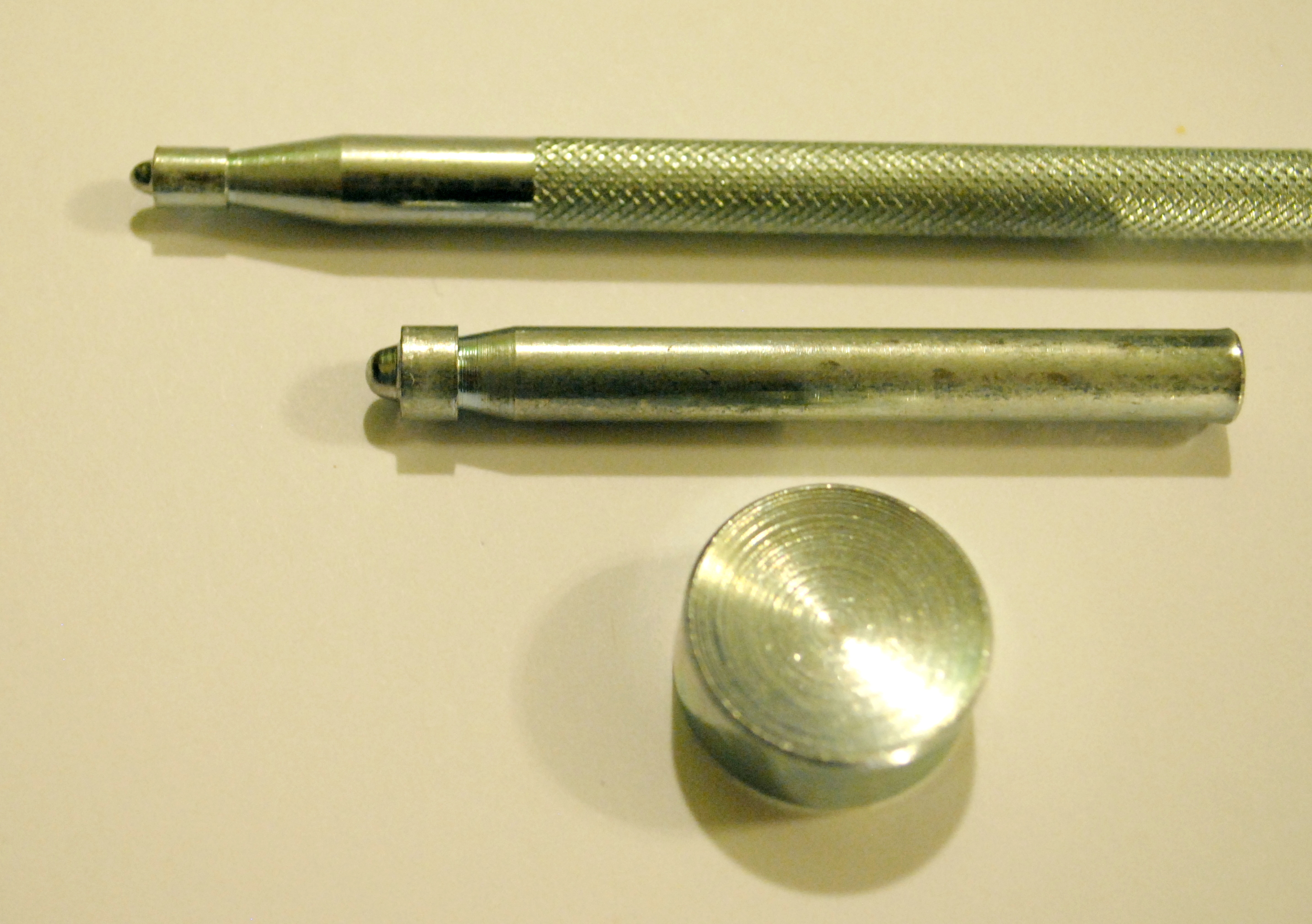
Tools used to apply a snap

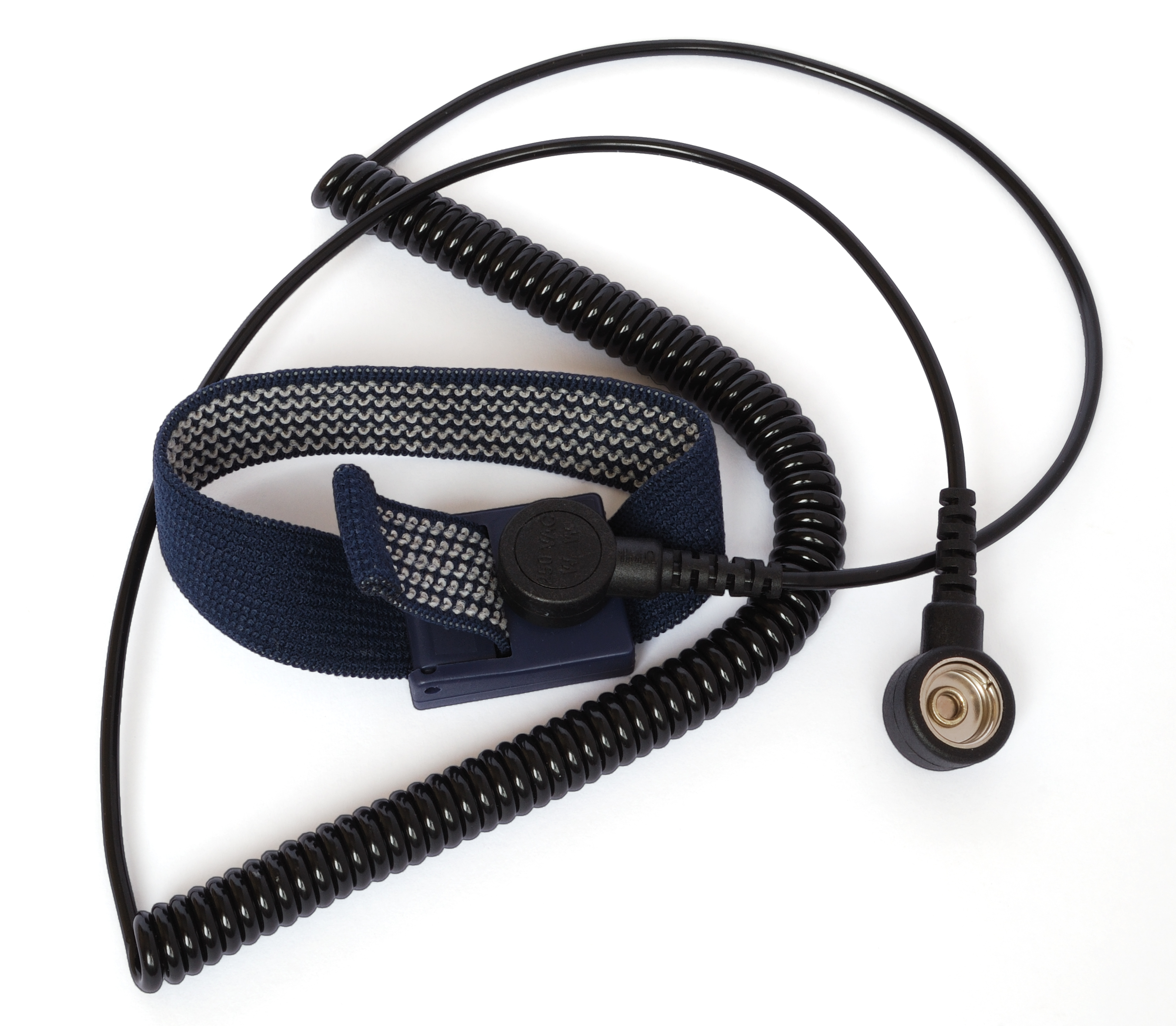
Antistatic wrist strap with 10 mm snap fastener
