= Jack Weil =

American businessman (1901–2008)

- Born: Jack Arnold Weil; March 28, 1901; Evansville, Indiana, U.S.
- Died: August 13, 2008 (aged 107); Denver, Colorado, U.S.
- Occupations: Founder and CEO of Rockmount Ranch Wear

Jack Arnold Weil (March 28, 1901 – August 13, 2008) was an American businessman who was the founder and CEO of the Denver-based Western clothing manufacturer Rockmount Ranch Wear and was believed to be the oldest working CEO in the United States.

== Life and career ==
Weil was born in Evansville, Indiana on March 28, 1901. In 1926, Weil (also known as Papa or "Papa Jack") married Beatrice Baum, and two years later the couple moved to Denver, Colorado, with their newborn son, Jack B. Seven years later, their daughter, Jane, was born, and in 1946, Weil rented a space at 1946 Wazee Street in Denver and set about trying to create a fashionable yet practical identity for the western ranchers of the region. Rockmount's fashions were featured prominently in the 2005 Academy Award-winning film Brokeback Mountain. Weil had five grandchildren—Greg, Gail, Janet, Steven, and Judy—all of whom worked at some point for the company. His grandson, Steven Weil, now runs the operation. Weil also had ten great-grandchildren, eight girls and three boys.

He was well known for coining the phrase "The West is not a place, it is a state of mind." He was the first person to put snaps on Western shirts, patented the saw-tooth pocket design seen on many Western shirts, and is credited with inventing the bolo tie.

Weil's wife died in 1990, followed by his son Jack B. in 2008.

He claimed to have quit smoking at age 60, drinking at age 90 and eating red meat at 100. However, Weil said he had a shot of Jack Daniel's twice a week for "medicinal purposes," specifically, to keep his blood thin.

Weil died at home in Denver, on August 13, 2008, at the age of 107.
