= Static electricity =

Imbalance of electric charges within or on the surface of a material

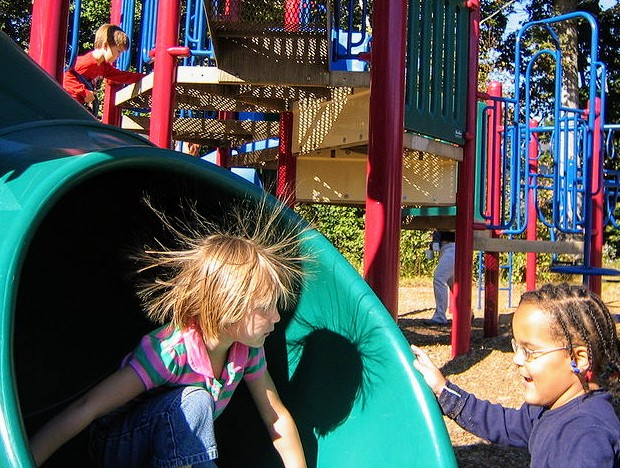
Example of the effect of static electricity on a child's hair

A simple experiment to demonstrate static electricity. A plastic scale rubbed on dry hair attracts paper bits.

Static electricity is an imbalance of electric charges within or on the surface of a material. The charge remains until it can move away as an electric current or by electrical discharge. The word "static" is used to differentiate it from current electricity, where an electric charge flows through an electrical conductor.

A static electric charge can be created whenever two surfaces contact and/or slide against each other and then separate. The effects of static electricity are familiar to most people because they can feel, hear, and even see sparks if the excess charge is neutralized when brought close to an electrical conductor (for example, a path to ground), or a region with an excess charge of the opposite polarity (positive or negative). The familiar phenomenon of a static shock – more specifically, an electrostatic discharge – is caused by the neutralization of a charge.

== Causes ==
Materials are made of atoms that are normally electrically neutral because they contain equal numbers of positive charges (protons in their nuclei) and negative charges (electrons in "shells" surrounding the nucleus). The phenomenon of static electricity requires a separation of positive and negative charges. When two materials are in contact, electrons may move from one material to the other, which leaves an excess of positive charge on one material, and an equal negative charge on the other. When the materials are separated, they retain this charge imbalance. It is also possible for ions to be transferred.

=== Contact-induced charge separation ===
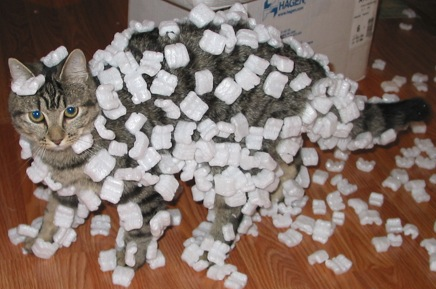
Styrofoam peanuts clinging to a cat's fur due to static electricity. This effect is also the cause of static cling in clothes.

Electrons or ions can be exchanged between materials on contact or when they slide against each other, which is known as the triboelectric effect and results in one material becoming positively charged and the other negatively charged. The triboelectric effect is the main cause of static electricity as observed in everyday life, and in common high-school science demonstrations involving rubbing different materials together (e.g., fur against an acrylic rod). Contact-induced charge separation causes one's hair to stand up and causes "static cling" (for example, a balloon rubbed against the hair becomes negatively charged; when near a wall, the charged balloon is attracted to positively charged particles in the wall, and can "cling" to it, suspended against gravity).

=== Pressure-induced charge separation ===
Applied mechanical stress generates an electric polarization and in turn this can lead to separation of charge in many types of materials. The free carriers at the surface of a material compensate for the polarization induced by the strains.

=== Heat-induced charge separation ===
Heating can generate electric polarization, which in turn can lead a separation of charge in certain materials. All pyroelectric materials are also piezoelectric and do not have inversion symmetry.

=== Charge-induced charge separation ===
A charged object brought close to an electrically neutral conductive object causes a separation of charge within the neutral object. This is called electrostatic induction. Charges of the same polarity are repelled and move to the side of the object away from the external charge, and charges of the opposite polarity are attracted and move to the side facing the charge. As the force due to the interaction of electric charges falls off rapidly with increasing distance, the effect of the closer (opposite polarity) charges is greater and the two objects feel a force of attraction. Careful grounding of part of an object can permanently add or remove electrons, leaving the object with a global, permanent charge.

== Removal and prevention ==
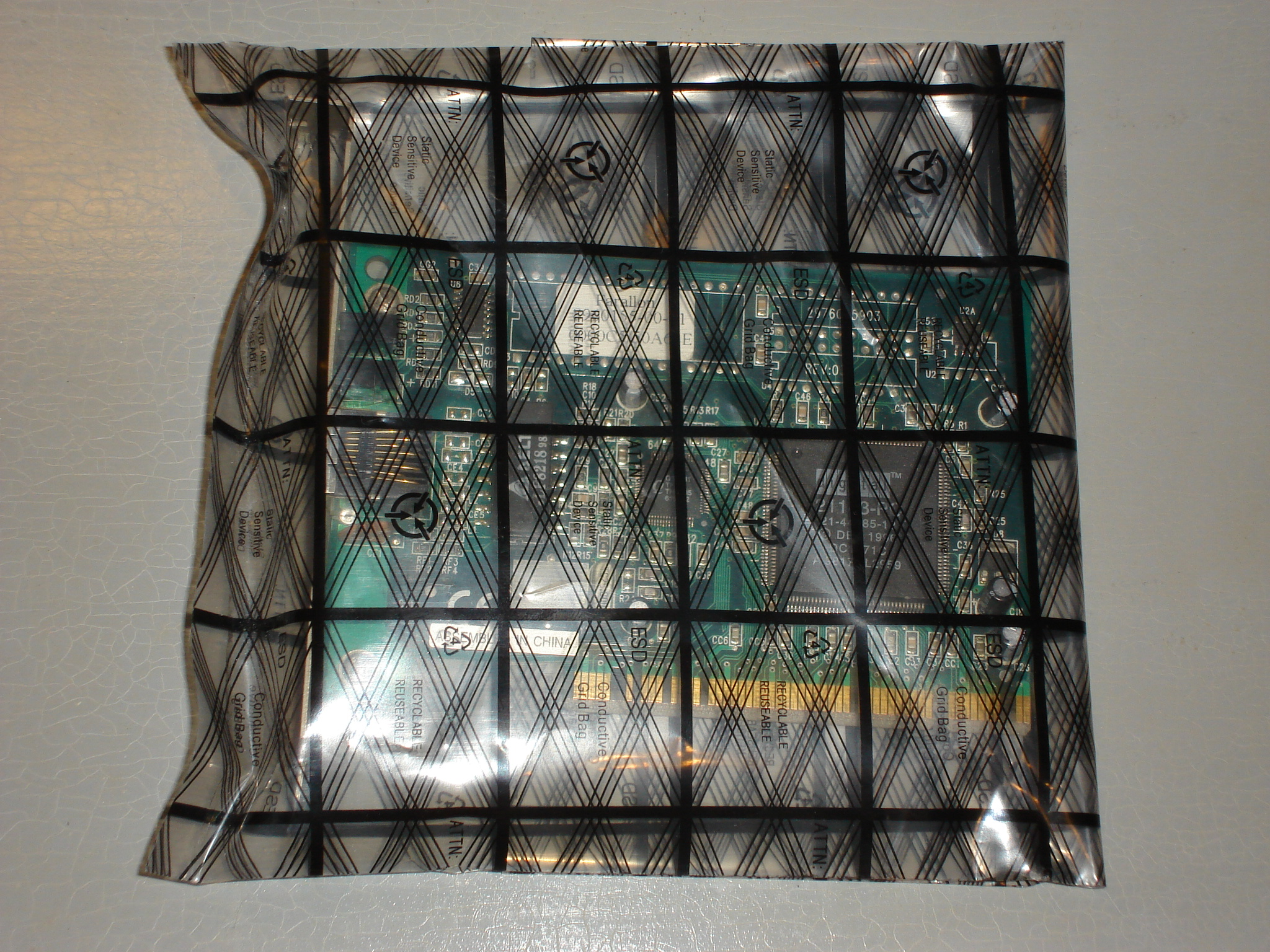
A network card inside an antistatic bag

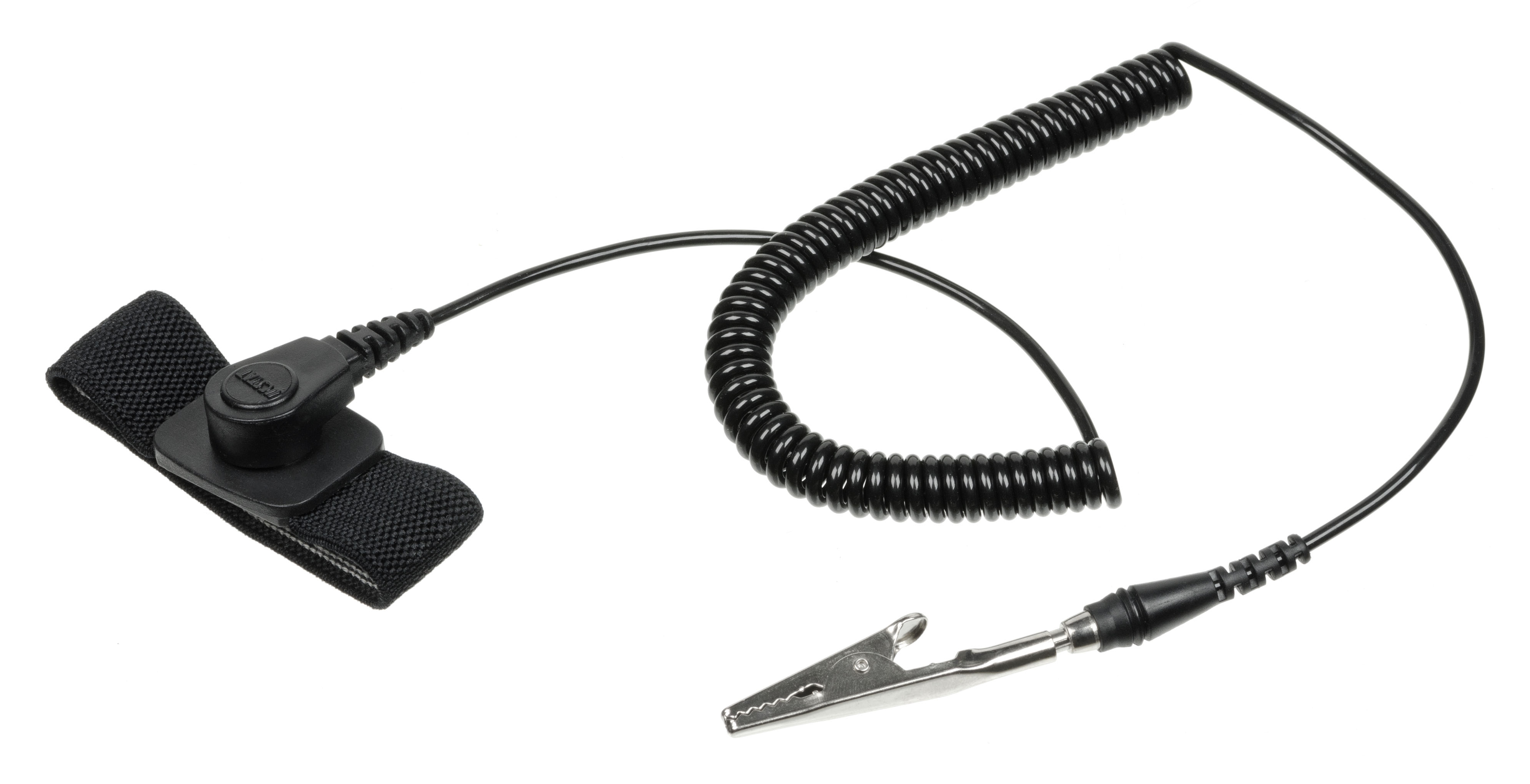
An antistatic wrist strap with crocodile clip

Removing or preventing a buildup of static charge can be as simple as opening a window or using a humidifier, to increase the moisture content of the air, making the atmosphere more conductive. Air ionizers can perform the same task.

Items that are particularly sensitive to static discharge may be treated with the application of an antistatic agent, which adds a conducting surface layer that ensures any excess charge is evenly distributed. Fabric softeners and dryer sheets used in washing machines and clothes dryers are an example of an antistatic agent used to prevent and remove static cling.

Many semiconductor devices used in electronics are particularly sensitive to static discharge. Conductive antistatic bags are commonly used to protect such components. People who work on circuits that contain these devices often ground themselves with a conductive antistatic strap.

In the industrial settings such as paint or flour plants as well as in hospitals, antistatic safety boots are sometimes used to prevent a buildup of static charge due to contact with the floor. These shoes have soles with good conductivity. Anti-static shoes should not be confused with insulating shoes, which provide exactly the opposite benefit – some protection against serious electric shocks from the mains voltage.

Within medical cable assemblies and lead wires, random triboelectric noise is generated when the various conductors, insulation, and fillers rub against each other as the cable is flexed during movement. Noise generated within a cable is often called handling noise or cable noise, but this type of unwanted signal is more accurately described as triboelectric noise. When measuring low-level signals, noise in cable or wire may present a problem. For example, the noise in an ECG or another medical signal may make accurate diagnosis difficult or even impossible. Keeping triboelectric noise at acceptable levels requires careful material selection, design, and processing as cable material is manufactured.

== Static discharge ==
The spark associated with static electricity is caused by electrostatic discharge, or simply static discharge, as excess charge is neutralized by a flow of charges from or to the surroundings.

The feeling of an electric shock is caused by the stimulation of nerves as the current flows through the human body. The energy stored as static electricity on an object varies depending on the size of the object and its capacitance, the voltage to which it is charged, and the dielectric constant of the surrounding medium. For modelling the effect of static discharge on sensitive electronic devices, a human being is represented as a capacitor of 100 picofarads, charged to a voltage of 4,000 to 35,000 volts. When touching an object this energy is discharged in less than a microsecond. While the total energy is small, on the order of millijoules, it can still damage sensitive electronic devices. Larger objects will store more energy, which may be directly hazardous to human contact or which may give a spark that can ignite flammable gas or dust.

=== Lightning ===
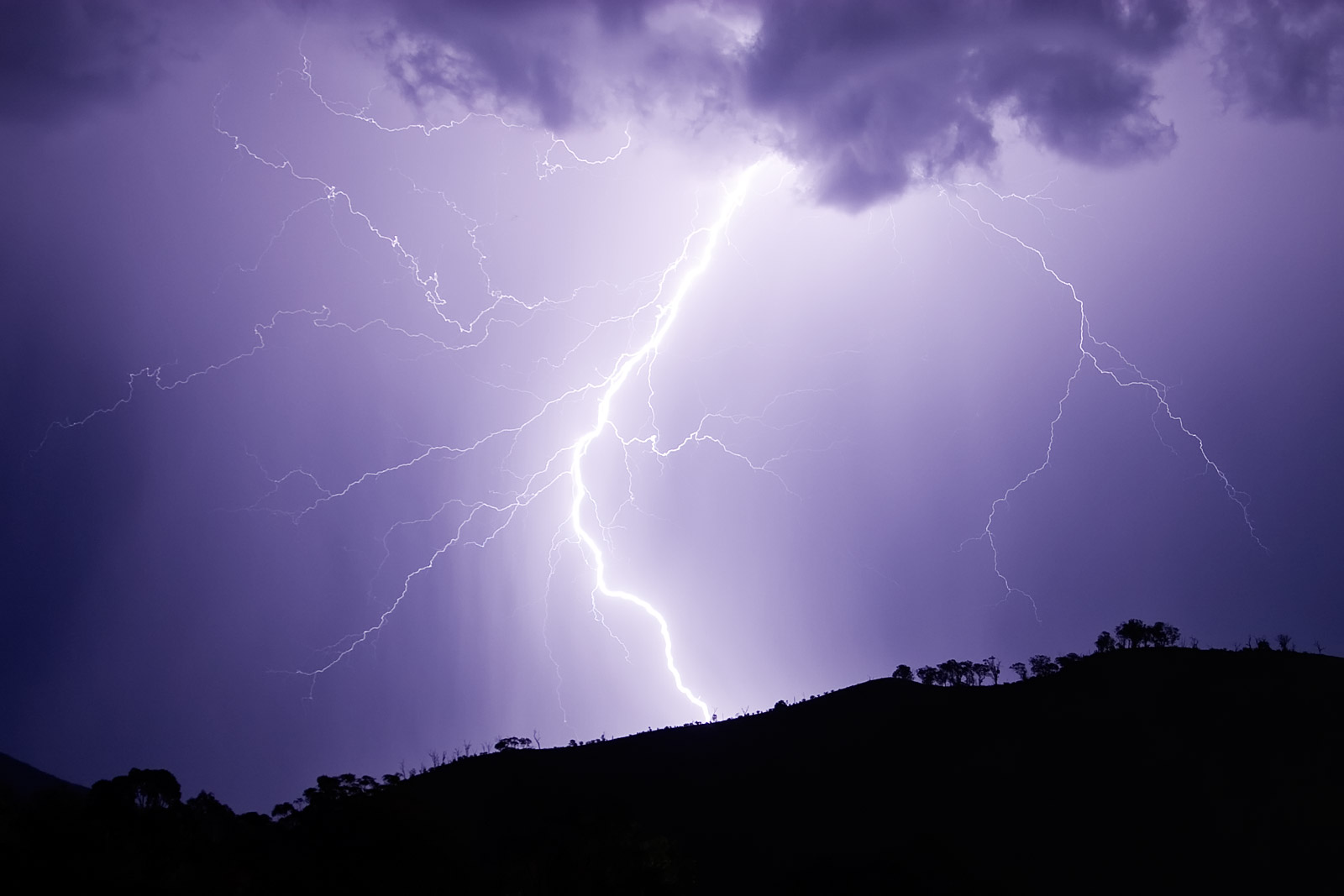
Natural static discharge caused by a lightning strike

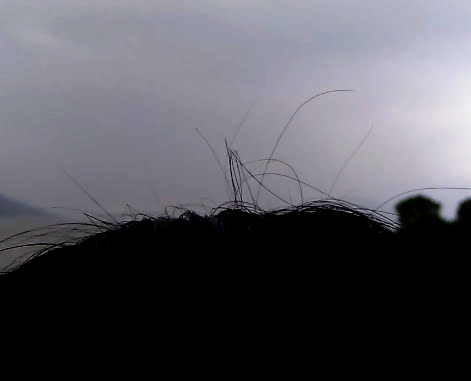
Small hairs standing up after a thunderstorm, as a result of the left-over weak static electricity

Lightning is a dramatic natural example of static discharge. While the details are unclear and remain a subject of debate, the initial charge separation is thought to be associated with contact between ice particles within storm clouds. In general, significant charge accumulations can only persist in regions of low electrical conductivity (very few charges free to move in the surroundings), hence the flow of neutralizing charges often results from neutral atoms and molecules in the air being torn apart to form separate positive and negative charges, which travel in opposite directions as an electric current, neutralizing the original accumulation of charge. The static charge in air typically breaks down in this way at around 10,000 volts per centimeter (10 kV/cm) depending on humidity. The discharge superheats the surrounding air causing the bright flash, and produces a shock wave causing the booming sound. A lightning bolt is simply a scaled-up version of the sparks seen in more domestic occurrences of static discharge. The flash occurs because the air in the discharge channel is heated to such a high temperature that it emits light by incandescence. The clap of thunder is the result of the shock wave created as the superheated air expands.

=== Electronic components ===
Many semiconductor devices used in electronics are very sensitive to the presence of static electricity and can be damaged by a static discharge. The use of an antistatic strap is mandatory for researchers manipulating nanodevices. Further precautions can be taken by taking off shoes with thick rubber soles and permanently staying with a metallic ground.

=== Static build-up in flowing flammable and ignitable materials ===
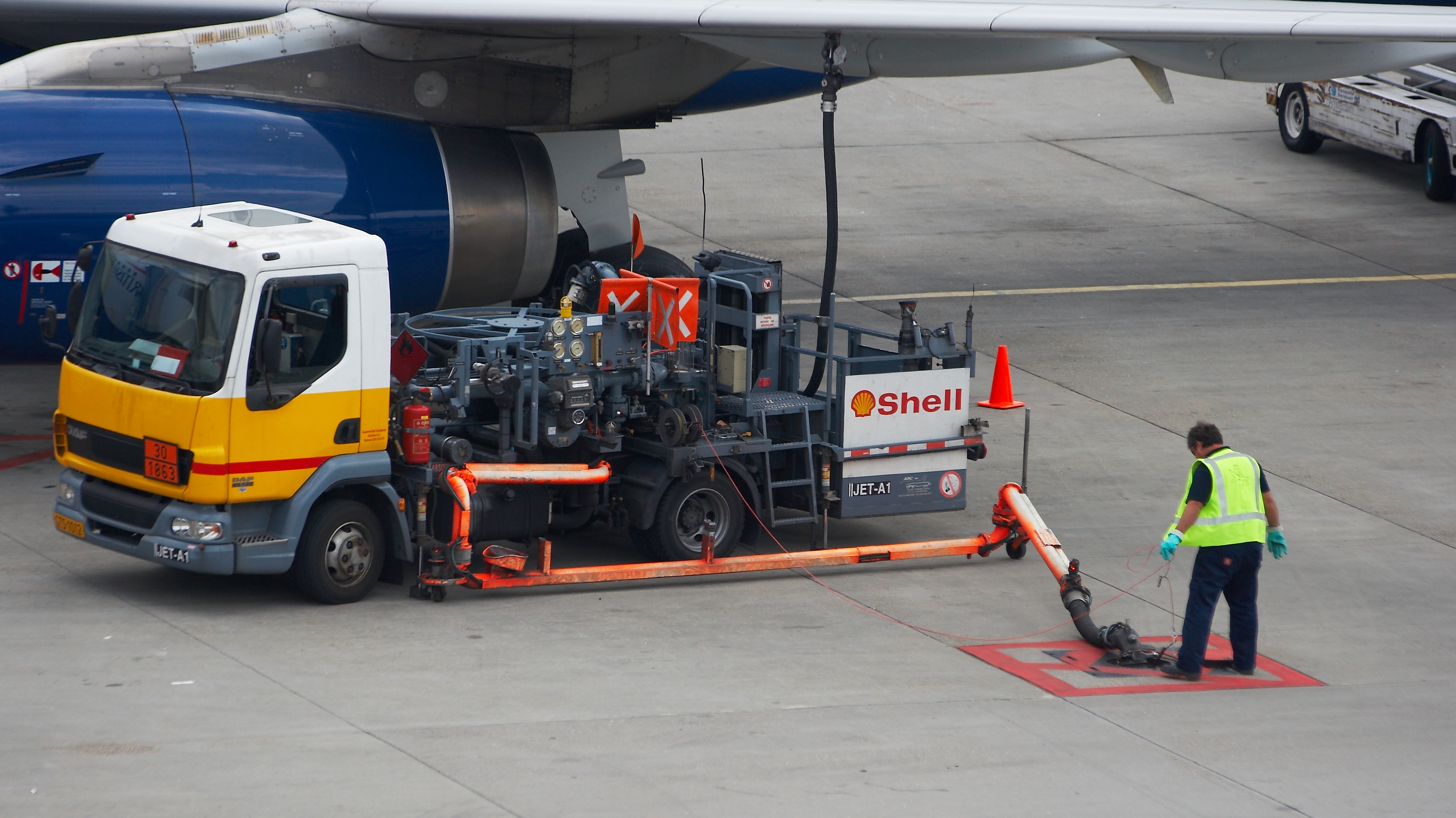
Static electricity is a major hazard when refueling an aircraft.

Discharge of static electricity can create severe hazards in those industries dealing with flammable substances, where a small electrical spark might ignite explosive mixtures.

The flowing movement of finely powdered substances or low conductivity fluids in pipes or through mechanical agitation can build up static electricity. The flow of granules of material such as sand down a plastic chute can transfer charge, which can be measured using a multimeter connected to metal foil lining the chute at intervals, and can be roughly proportional to particulate flow. Dust clouds of finely powdered substances can become combustible or explosive. When there is a static discharge in a dust or vapor cloud, explosions have occurred. Among the major industrial incidents that have occurred due to static discharge are the explosion of a grain silo in southwest France, a paint plant in Thailand, a factory making fiberglass moldings in Canada, a storage tank explosion in Glenpool, Oklahoma in 2003, and a portable tank filling operation and a tank farm in Des Moines, Iowa and Valley Center, Kansas in 2007.

The ability of a fluid to retain an electrostatic charge depends on its electrical conductivity. When low conductivity fluids flow through pipelines or are mechanically agitated, contact-induced charge separation called flow electrification occurs. Fluids that have low electrical conductivity (below 50 picosiemens per meter), are called accumulators. Fluids having conductivity above 50 pS/m are called non-accumulators. In non-accumulators, charges recombine as fast as they are separated and hence electrostatic charge accumulation is not significant. In the petrochemical industry, 50 pS/m is the recommended minimum value of electrical conductivity for adequate removal of charge from a fluid.

Kerosines may have conductivity ranging from less than 1 picosiemens per meter to 20 pS/m. For comparison, deionized water has a conductivity of about 10,000,000 pS/m or 10 μS/m.

Transformer oil is part of the electrical insulation system of large power transformers and other electrical apparatus. Re-filling of large apparatus requires precautions against electrostatic charging of the fluid, which may damage sensitive transformer insulation.

An important concept for insulating fluids is the static relaxation time. This is similar to the time constant τ (tau) of an RC circuit. For insulating materials, it is the ratio of the static dielectric constant divided by the electrical conductivity of the material. For hydrocarbon fluids, this is sometimes approximated by dividing the number 18 by the electrical conductivity of the fluid. Thus a fluid that has an electrical conductivity of 1 pS/m has an estimated relaxation time of about 18 seconds. The excess charge in a fluid dissipates almost completely after four to five times the relaxation time, or 90 seconds for the fluid in the above example.

Charge generation increases at higher fluid velocities and larger pipe diameters, becoming quite significant in pipes 8 inches (200 mm) or larger. Static charge generation in these systems is best controlled by limiting fluid velocity. The British standard BS PD CLC/TR 50404:2003 (formerly BS-5958-Part 2) Code of Practice for Control of Undesirable Static Electricity prescribes pipe flow velocity limits. Because water content has a large impact on the fluids dielectric constant, the recommended velocity for hydrocarbon fluids containing water should be limited to 1 meter per second.

Bonding and earthing are the usual ways charge buildup can be prevented. For fluids with electrical conductivity below 10 pS/m, bonding and earthing are not adequate for charge dissipation, and anti-static additives may be required.

==== Fueling operations ====
The flowing movement of flammable liquids like gasoline inside a pipe can build up static electricity. Non-polar liquids such as gasoline, toluene, xylene, diesel, kerosene and light crude oils exhibit significant ability for charge accumulation and charge retention during high velocity flow. Electrostatic discharges can ignite the fuel vapor. When the electrostatic discharge energy is high enough, it can ignite a fuel vapor and air mixture. Different fuels have different flammable limits and require different levels of electrostatic discharge energy to ignite.

Electrostatic discharge while fueling with gasoline is a present danger at gas stations. Fires have also been started at airports while refueling aircraft with kerosene. New grounding technologies, the use of conducting materials, and the addition of anti-static additives help to prevent or safely dissipate the buildup of static electricity. Customers who need to fill containers at gas stations are advised to set them on the ground first so that any static buildup will dissipate without risk of fire or explosion.

The flowing movement of gases in pipes alone creates little, if any, static electricity. It is envisaged that a charge generation mechanism only occurs when solid particles or liquid droplets are carried in the gas stream.

=== In space exploration ===
Due to the extremely low humidity in extraterrestrial environments, very large static charges can accumulate, causing a major hazard for the complex electronics used in space exploration vehicles. Static electricity is thought to be a particular hazard for astronauts on planned missions to the Moon and Mars. Walking over the extremely dry terrain could cause them to accumulate a significant amount of charge; reaching out to open the airlock on their return could cause a large static discharge, potentially damaging sensitive electronics.

=== Ozone cracking ===
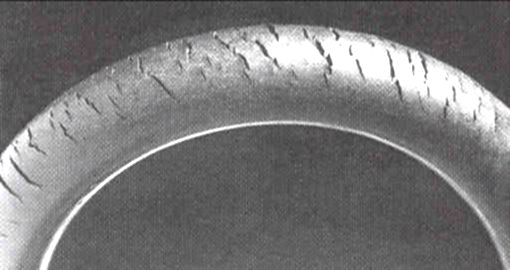
Ozone cracking in natural rubber tubing

A static discharge in the presence of air or oxygen can create ozone, which can degrade rubber parts. Many elastomers are sensitive to ozone cracking. Exposure to ozone creates deep penetrative cracks in critical components like gaskets and O-rings. Fuel lines are also susceptible to the problem unless preventive action is taken. Preventive measures include adding anti-ozonants to the rubber mix, or using an ozone-resistant elastomer. Fires from cracked fuel lines have been a problem on vehicles, especially in the engine compartments where ozone can be produced by electrical equipment.

== Energies involved ==
The energy released in a static electricity discharge may vary over a wide range. The energy in joules can be calculated from the capacitance (C) of the object and the static potential V in volts (V) by the formula E = ½CV^{2}. One experimenter estimates the capacitance of the human body as high as 400 picofarads, and a voltage of 50,000 volts, discharged e.g. during touching a charged car, creating a spark with energy of 500 millijoules. Another estimate is 100–300 pF and 20,000 volts, producing a maximum energy of 60 mJ. IEC 479-2:1987 states that a discharge with energy greater than 5000 mJ is a direct serious risk to human health. IEC 60065 states that consumer products cannot discharge more than 350 mJ into a person.

The maximal potential is limited to about 35–40 kV, due to corona discharge dissipating the charge at higher potentials. Potentials below 3000 volts are not typically detectable by humans. Maximal potential commonly achieved on human body range between 1 and 10 kV, though in optimal conditions as high as 20–25 kV can be reached. Low relative humidity increases the charge buildup; walking 20 feet (6 m) on vinyl floor at 15% relative humidity causes buildup of voltage up to 12 kV, while at 80% humidity the voltage is only 1.5 kV.

As little as 0.2 millijoules may present an ignition hazard; such low spark energy is often below the threshold of human visual and auditory perception.

Typical ignition energies are:

- 0.017 mJ for hydrogen,
- 0.2–2 mJ for hydrocarbon vapors,
- 1–50 mJ for fine flammable dust,
- 40–1000 mJ for coarse flammable dust.

The energy needed to damage most electronic devices is between 2 and 1000 nanojoules.

A relatively small energy, often as little as 0.2–2 millijoules, is needed to ignite a flammable mixture of a fuel and air. For the common industrial hydrocarbon gases and solvents, the minimum ignition energy required for ignition of vapor–air mixture is lowest for the vapor concentration roughly in the middle between the lower explosive limit and the upper explosive limit, and rapidly increases as the concentration deviates from this optimum to either side. Aerosols of flammable liquids may be ignited well below their flash point. Generally, liquid aerosols with particle sizes below 10 micrometers behave like vapors, particle sizes above 40 micrometers behave more like flammable dusts. Typical minimal flammable concentrations of aerosols lay between 15 and 50 g/m^{3}. Similarly, presence of foam on the surface of a flammable liquid significantly increases ignitability. Aerosol of flammable dust can be ignited as well, resulting in a dust explosion; the lower explosive limit usually lies between 50 and 1000 g/m^{3}; finer dusts tend to be more explosive and requiring less spark energy to set off. Simultaneous presence of flammable vapors and flammable dust can significantly decrease the ignition energy; a mere 1 vol.% of propane in air can reduce the required ignition energy of dust by 100 times. Higher than normal oxygen content in atmosphere also significantly lowers the ignition energy.

There are five types of electrical discharges:

- Spark, responsible for the majority of industrial fires and explosions where static electricity is involved. Sparks occur between objects at different electric potentials. Good grounding of all parts of the equipment and precautions against charge buildups on equipment and personnel are used as prevention measures.
- Brush discharge occurs from a nonconductive charged surface or highly charged nonconductive liquids. The energy is limited to roughly 4 millijoules. To be hazardous, the voltage involved must be above about 20 kilovolts, the surface polarity must be negative, a flammable atmosphere must be present at the point of discharge, and the discharge energy must be sufficient for ignition. Further, because surfaces have a maximal charge density, an area of at least 100 cm^{2} has to be involved. This is not considered to be a hazard for dust clouds.
- Propagating brush discharge is high in energy and dangerous. Occurs when an insulating surface of up to 8 mm thick (e.g. a teflon or glass lining of a grounded metal pipe or a reactor) is subjected to a large charge buildup between the opposite surfaces, acting as a large-area capacitor.
- Cone discharge, also called bulking brush discharge, occurs over surfaces of charged powders with resistance above 10^{10} ohms, or also deep through the powder mass. Cone discharges are not usually observed in dust volumes below 1 m^{3}. The energy involved depends on the grain size of the powder and the charge magnitude, and can reach up to 20 mJ. Larger dust volumes produce higher energies.
- Corona discharge, considered non-hazardous.

== See also ==
- Lightning rod
- Electrical charge
- Electrostatic discharge
- Electrostatic generator
- Electrostatics
- Triboelectric effect
- Van de Graaff generator
- Wimshurst machine
