= Static cling =

Sticking caused by static electricity

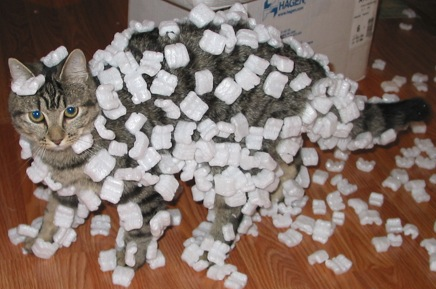
Styrofoam peanuts stuck to a cat's fur as a result of static cling.

Static cling is the tendency for light objects to stick (cling) to other objects owing to static electricity. Common everyday examples include dust and pet fur clinging to clothing, socks sticking together after being removed from a clothes dryer, or a rubber balloon attracting water after being rubbed against hair.

Static cling represents a fundamental demonstration of electrostatics and has significant implications in manufacturing, electronics cooling, and material handling.

== Physics and mechanism ==
Static cling is primarily driven by the triboelectric effect, a type of contact electrification where certain materials become electrically charged after they are separated from a different material with which they were in contact.

When two materials rub together, friction increases the surface contact area, allowing electrons to transfer from one material to the other. The material that gains electrons acquires a negative charge, while the material that loses electrons acquires a positive charge. The attractive force between these oppositely charged surfaces is governed by Coulomb's law, which states that the electrostatic force, $F$, between two point charges $q_1$ and $q_2$ is directly proportional to the product of their magnitudes and inversely proportional to the square of their separation, $r$:

$$F = k_e \frac{q_1 q_2}{r^2}$$

where $k_e$ is the Coulomb constant.

Because the objects involved in static cling (like fabrics, dust particles, and others) are typically lightweight, this electrostatic force is strong enough to overcome the force of gravity, causing the objects to stick together.

=== The triboelectric series ===
The likelihood and polarity of the charge transfer depend on the materials' positions in the triboelectric series. Materials widely separated on the series (e.g., human skin and Teflon, or glass and polyurethane) will generate a much stronger static charge when rubbed together than materials close to each other. Synthetic fabrics, such as polyester and nylon, are highly prone to exchanging electrons, which is why static cling is notoriously common in modern athletic wear and synthetic blends.

== Impact on electronics ==
Dust accumulation caused by static cling is a significant issue for computers and other electronic devices with heat-generating components that need to be cooled by airflow.

Dust is carried into the computer by the airflow created by case and component fans. Due to the rapid movement of air over synthetic and metallic components, electrostatic charges develop. The accumulating dust forms an insulating blanket over metal surfaces and clogs the empty space between the fins of heatsinks, severely diminishing the dissipation of heat and interrupting the outward flow of warm air.

For critical components such as microprocessors and memory banks, this raises the risk of thermal throttling or permanent damage. To compensate, temperature-controlled fans raise their RPM, generating excess noise and shortening their mechanical lifespan. Furthermore, the accumulated dust creates new statically charged surfaces and physical blockades, causing the rate of dust accumulation to grow exponentially over time.

== In advertising and commercial products ==
The principles of static cling have been harnessed for commercial applications, most notably in the creation of adhesive-free decals. These decals are typically made from highly plasticized vinyl (PVC). Because the material is highly insulating and pliable, it conforms perfectly to smooth surfaces (like glass or mirrors) and relies on an induced electrostatic charge and atmospheric pressure to remain attached, rather than chemical adhesives.

Advertisers in urban areas, eager to use guerilla marketing techniques, have turned to static cling decals as a distribution medium. Because they leave no sticky residue and are easily removed, they are heavily utilized for temporary storefront window promotions. In a notable advertising campaign for Microsoft's MSN 8 Internet service on October 24, 2002, hundreds of decals of the MSN butterfly logo were affixed to surfaces throughout New York City. The New York Times reported that it was static cling that held them there, prompting city officials to demand their removal.

== See also ==
- Electrostatics
- Triboelectric effect
- Antistatic device
- Adhesion
