= Albert-Pierre Raymond =

French industrialist

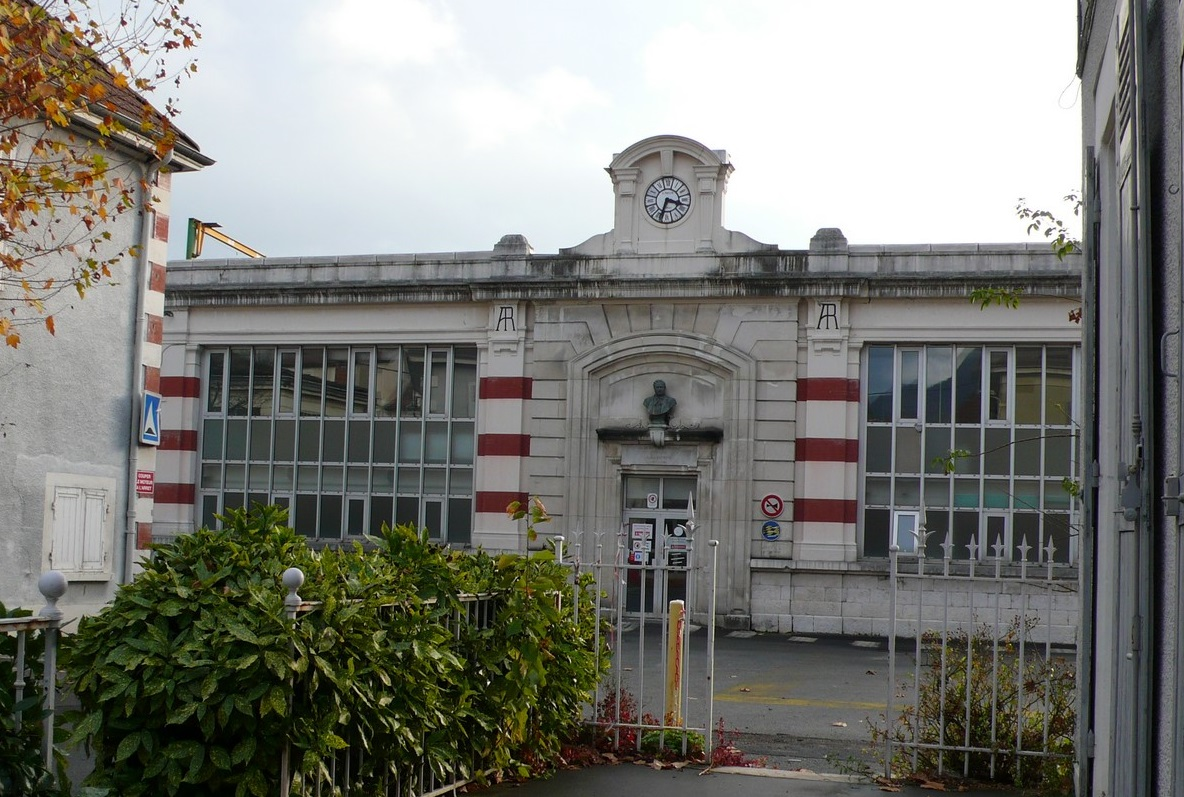
- Born: 1840
- Died: 1913
- Resting place: Saint Roch Cemetery, Grenoble, France
- Occupation: Industrialist
- Known for: Founding and leading the ARaymond company and patenting the snap fastener

Albert-Pierre Raymond (1840 – 1913) was a French industrialist. He founded the ARaymond company, and he patented the snap fastener. His initial patent was filed on May 29, 1886. He also patented this invention in the U.S. and Japan.

== ARaymond ==
In 1865, along with Benoît Allègre, an egraver, and Alexandre Guttin, a gilder, Albert-Pierre opened a workshop to manufacture snap fasteners to be integrated into textile gloves. The snap fasteners replaced traditional glove buttons which were less practical. To this day, ARaymond manufactures and offers fastening products in the fields of automotive, energy, agriculture, healthcare, and construction. It is based in Grenoble, France. More than 8,000 people work for ARaymond, which acquired rival company Tinnerman Palnut in 2009. Since Albert-Pierre, the company has been run by Achille Raymond, Albert-Victor Raymond, Alain Raymond, and Antoine Raymond.

Over the years ARaymond has expanded its presence in 25 countries. These include countries such as the United States, Canada, India, Germany, and South Korea.
