= Electrostatic-sensitive device =

Components that can be damaged by electrostatic discharges

Warning symbol denoting a device's susceptibility to electrostatic discharge.

Symbol for an ESD protection device – EPA

Alternate warning symbol

Symbol of an ESD grounding point for all components

An electrostatic-sensitive device (often abbreviated ESD) is any component (primarily electrical) that can be damaged by common static charges that build up on people, tools, or other non-conductors or semiconductors. ESD also stands for electrostatic discharge.

== Overview ==
As electronic parts like computer central processing units (CPUs) become packed more and more densely with transistors the transistors shrink and become more and more vulnerable to ESD.

Common electrostatic-sensitive devices include:

- MOSFET transistors, used to make integrated circuits (ICs)
- CMOS ICs (chips), integrated circuits built with MOSFETs. Examples are computer CPUs, graphics ICs.
- Computer cards
- TTL chips
- Laser diodes
- Blue light-emitting diodes (LEDs)
- High precision resistors

The notion of a symbol for an ESD protection device came about in response to the increased usage and failures of static sensitive components by computer systems manufacturer, Sperry Univac. Field repairs and handling of ESD printed circuit boards (PCBs) were causing high failure rates. Studies of PCB failures indicated that static damage to chips and PCBs were caused by field service engineers who were often unaware of the need for precautions in handling ESD sensitive parts. Responding to the problem, Robert F. Gabriel, a Systems Engineer at Sperry Univac devised a large number of possible symbols to affix to parts, packaging, and PCBs to alert the user to ESD-sensitivity. Gabriel circulated a proposal for an ESD warning symbol to numerous electronics standards groups. C. Everett Coon at the EIA (Electronics Industry Association) enthusiastically responded to the idea, and coordinated a worldwide effort among various standards bodies and interest groups to devise an easily recognized symbol that would be devoid of verbiage and alert personnel to the need for ESD handling precautions. Three years of worldwide debate over the graphics and color scheme produced the symbol at the top right of this page in the late 1970s. Some later adopted variations to the design, but the original remains the most common.

== ESD-safe working ==
Often, ESD sensitive components must ship in conductive foam or an ESD-safe bag. When working with them, a technician often uses a grounding mat or other grounding tool to prevent electrostatic discharge. A technician may also wear antistatic garments or an antistatic wrist strap.

There are several kinds of ESD protective materials:

- Conductive: Materials with an electrical resistance between 1 kΩ and 1 MΩ
- Dissipative: Materials with an electrical resistance between 1 MΩ and 1 TΩ
- Shielding: Materials that attenuate current and electrical fields
- Low-charging or anti-static: Materials that limit the buildup of charge by prevention of triboelectric effects through physical separation or by selecting materials that do not build up charge easily.

== See also ==
- Antistatic agent
- Antistatic device
- Antistatic garments
- Electrostatic discharge materials
