= Velostat =

Electrically conductive packaging material

Velostat, also known as Linqstat, is a packaging material made of a polymeric foil (polyolefins) impregnated with carbon black to make it somewhat electrically conductive. It is used for the protection of items or devices that are susceptible to damage from electrostatic discharge. It was developed by Custom Materials, now part of 3M. Velostat is a U.S. registered trademark (4,964,564) of Desco Industries Inc. Desco Industries purchased the assets of the 3M Static Control business on January 2, 2015.

Velostat is piezoresistive; its resistance changes with flexing or pressure. For instance, 25 mm^{2} of 0.2 mm fresh Velostat sandwiched between two electrodes has a resistance around 9 kΩ without any force applied, but only 1 kΩ when 3 Newtons of force is applied. For material that has been used, those resistances are roughly halved.

Velostat's low cost and piezoresistive properties have made it popular for making inexpensive flex or pressure sensors for microcontrollers. One example is shoes which light up when the wearer steps. Since Velostat's resistance is reduced when pressure is applied, a voltage divider measuring that resistance can indicate when weight is applied or removed from the shoes.

== See also ==
- ESD materials
- Force-sensing resistor (FSR)
