= Antistatic device =

Device that reduces or inhibits electrostatic discharge

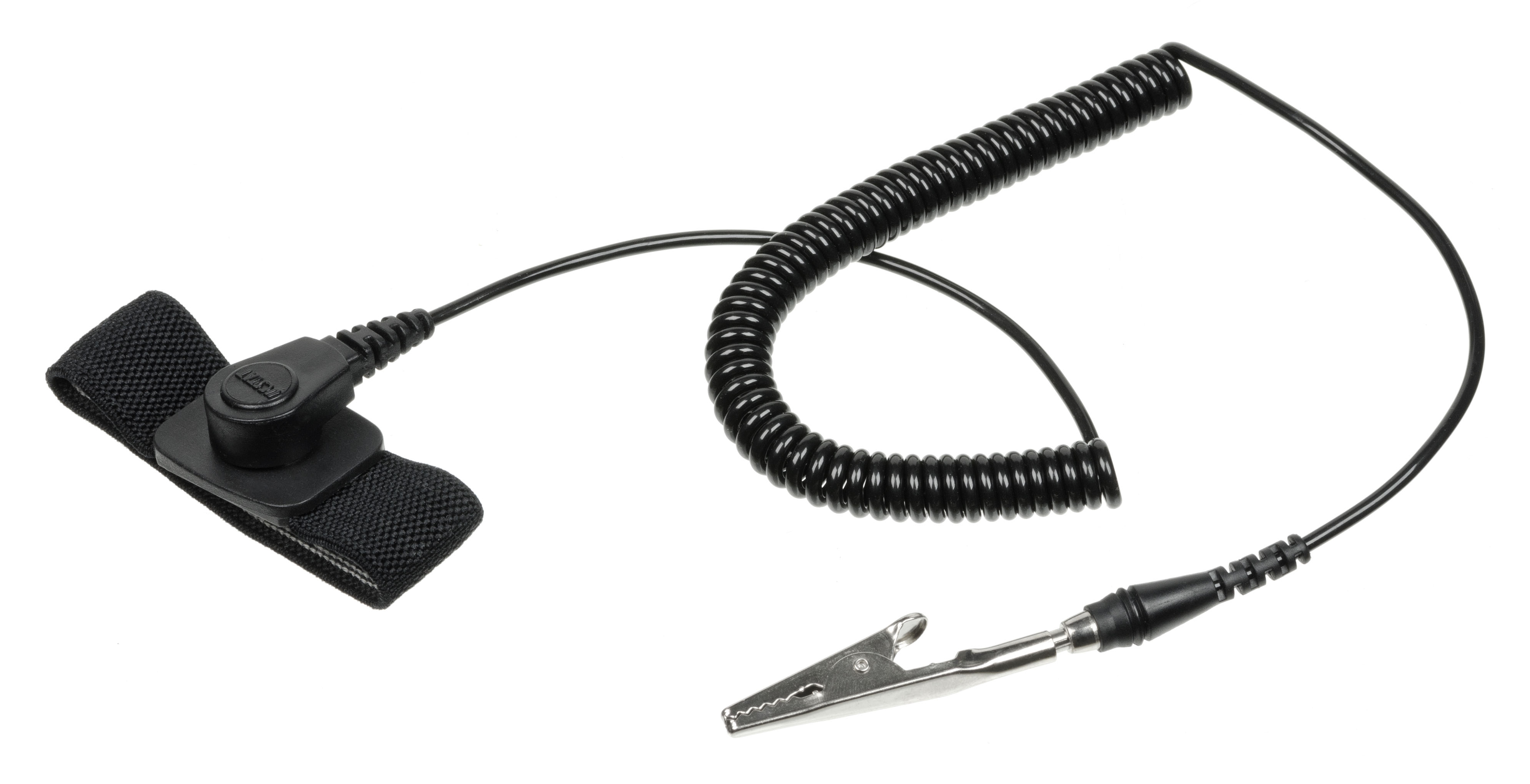
An antistatic wrist strap with crocodile clip.

An antistatic device is any device that reduces, dampens, or otherwise inhibits electrostatic discharge, or ESD, which is the buildup or discharge of static electricity. ESD can damage electrical components such as computer hard drives, and even ignite flammable liquids and gases.

Many methods exist for neutralizing static electricity, varying in use and effectiveness depending on the application. Antistatic agents are chemical compounds that can be added to an object, or the packaging of an object, to help deter the buildup or discharge of static electricity. For the neutralization of static charge in a larger area, such as a factory floor, semiconductor cleanroom or workshop, antistatic systems may utilize electron emission effects such as corona discharge or photoemission that introduce ions into the area that combine with and neutralize any electrically charged object. In many situations, sufficient ESD protection can be achieved with electrical grounding.

== Symbology ==
Various symbols can be found on products, indicating that the product is electrostatically sensitive, as with sensitive electrical components, or that it offers antistatic protection, as with antistatic bags.

=== Reach symbol ===
ANSI/ESD standard S8.1-2007 is most commonly seen on applications related to electronics. Several variations consist of a triangle with a reaching hand depicted inside of it using negative space.

Versions of the symbol will often have the hand being crossed out as a warning for the component being protected, indicating that it is ESD sensitive and is not to be touched unless antistatic precautions are taken.
Another version of the symbol has the triangle surrounded by an arc. This variant is in reference to the antistatic protective device, such as an antistatic wrist strap, rather than the component being protected. It usually does not feature the hand being crossed out, indicating that it makes contact with the component safe.

=== Circle ===
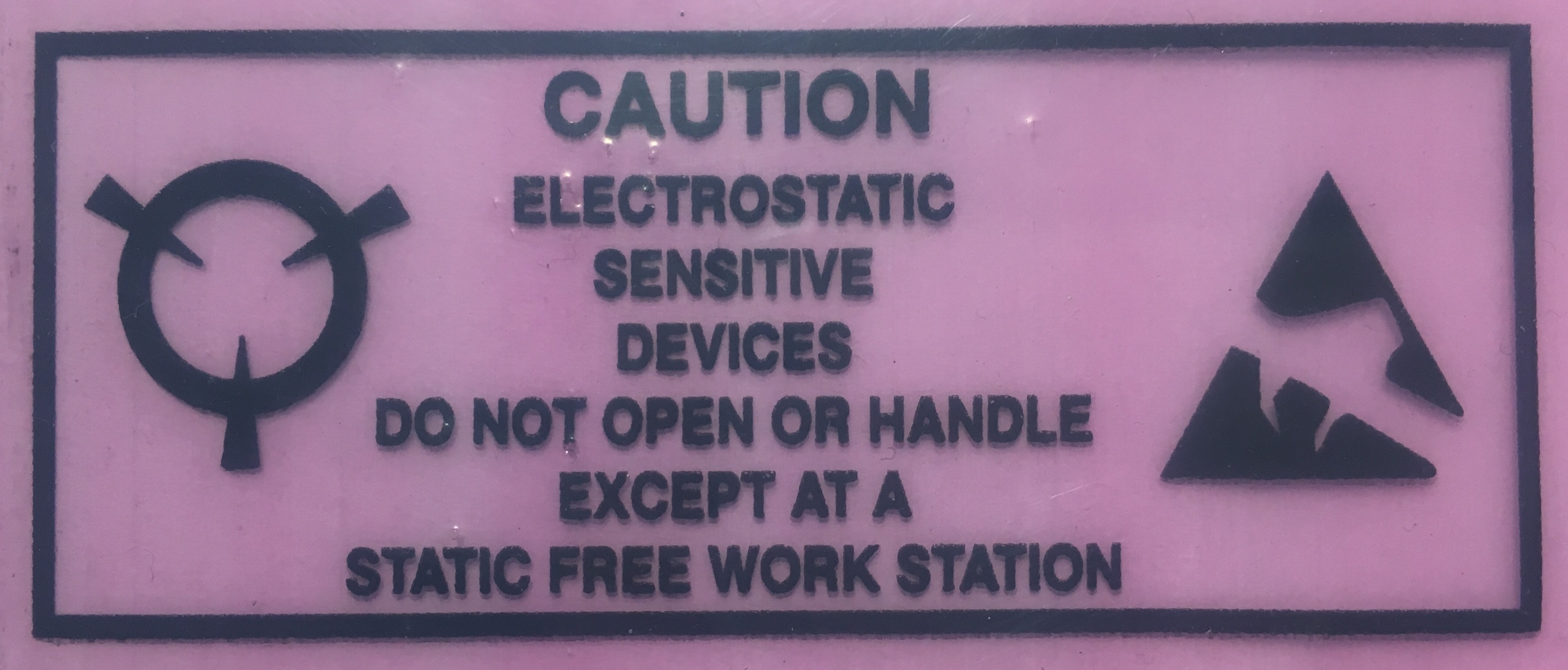
A label on an antistatic bag featuring the circle symbol on the left and the reaching symbol on the right

Another common symbol takes the form of a bold circle being intersected by three arrows. Originating from a U.S. military standard, it has been adopted industry-wide. It is intended as a depiction of a device or component being breached by static charges, indicated by the arrows.

== Examples ==
Types of antistatic devices include:

=== Antistatic bag ===
An antistatic bag is a bag used for storing or shipping electronic components which may be prone to damage caused by ESD.

=== Ionizing bar ===
An ionizing bar, sometimes referred to as a static bar, is a type of industrial equipment used for removing static electricity from a production line to dissipate static cling and other such phenomena that would disrupt the line. It is important in the manufacturing and printing industries, although it can be used in other applications as well.

Ionizing bars are most commonly suspended above a conveyor belt or other apparatus in a production line where the product can pass below it; the distance is usually calibrated for the specific application. The bar works by emitting an ionized corona onto the products below it. If then a product on the line has a positive or negative static charge, as it passes through the ionized aura created by the bar, it will attract the correspondingly charged positive or negative ions and become electrically neutral.

=== Antistatic garments ===
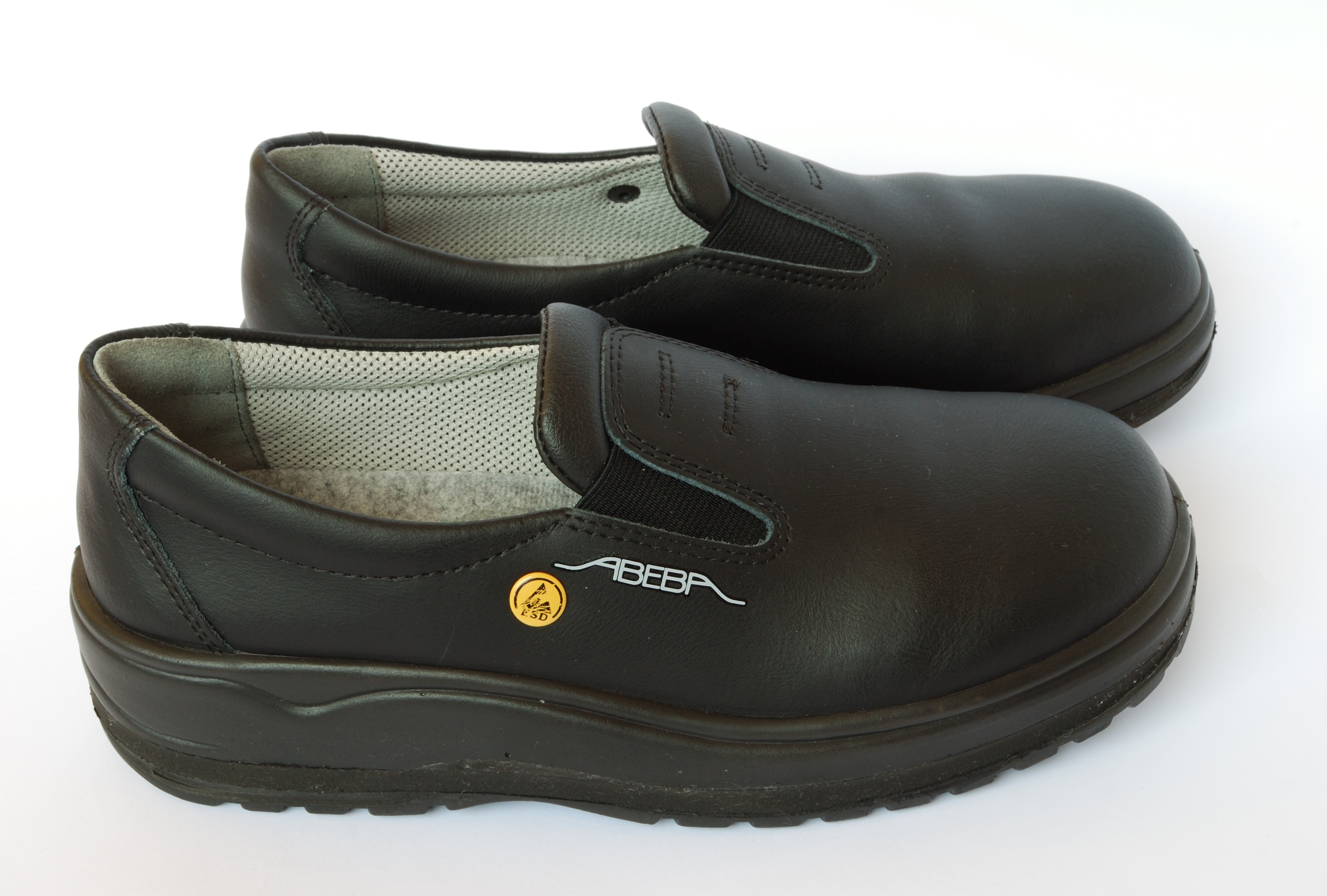
Antistatic shoes

Antistatic garments or antistatic clothing can be used to prevent damage to electrical components or to prevent fires and explosions when working with flammable liquids and gases. Antistatic garments are used in many industries such as electronics, communications, telecommunications and defense applications.

Antistatic garments have conductive threads in them, creating a wearable version of a Faraday cage. Antistatic garments attempt to shield ESD sensitive devices from harmful static charges from clothing such as wool, silk, and synthetic fabrics on people working with them. For these garments to work properly, they must also be connected to ground with a strap. Most garments are not conductive enough to provide personal grounding, so antistatic wrist and foot straps are also worn. There are three types of static control garments that are compliant to the ANSI/ESD S20.20-2014 standards: 1) static control garment, 2) groundable static control garment, 3) groundable static control garment system.

=== Antistatic mat ===
An antistatic floor mat or ground mat is one of a number of antistatic devices designed to help eliminate static electricity. It does this by having a controlled low resistance: a metal mat would keep parts grounded but would short out exposed parts; an insulating mat would provide no ground reference and so would not provide grounding. Typical resistance is on the order of 10^{5} to 10^{8} ohms between points on the mat and to ground. The mat would need to be grounded (earthed). This is usually accomplished by plugging into the grounded line in an electrical outlet. It is important to discharge at a slow rate, therefore a resistor should be used in grounding the mat. The resistor, as well as allowing high-voltage charges to leak through to ground, also prevents a shock hazard when working with low-voltage parts. Some ground mats allow one to connect an antistatic wrist strap to them. Versions are designed for placement on both the floor and desk.

=== Antistatic wrist strap ===
An antistatic wrist strap, ESD wrist strap, or ground bracelet is an antistatic device used to safely ground a person working on very sensitive electronic equipment, to prevent the buildup of static electricity on their body, which can result in ESD. It is used in the electronics industry when handling electronic devices which can be damaged by ESD, and also sometimes by people working around explosives, to prevent electric sparks which could set off an explosion. It consists of an elastic band of fabric with fine conductive fibers woven into it, attached to a wire with a clip on the end to connect it to a ground conductor. The fibers are usually made of carbon or carbon-filled rubber, and the strap is bound with a stainless steel clasp or plate. They are usually used in conjunction with an antistatic mat on the workbench, or a special static-dissipating plastic laminate on the workbench surface.

The wrist strap is usually worn on the nondominant hand (the left wrist for a right-handed person). It is connected to ground through a coiled retractable cable and 1 megaohm resistor, which allows high-voltage charges to leak through but prevents a shock hazard when working with low-voltage parts. Where higher voltages are present, extra resistance (0.75 megaohm per 250 V) is added in the path to ground to protect the wearer from excessive currents; this typically takes the form of a 4 megaohm resistor in the coiled cable (or, more commonly, a 2 megaohm resistor at each end).

Wrist straps designed for industrial use usually connect to ground connections built into the workplace, via either a standard 4 mm plug or 10 mm press stud, whereas straps designed for consumer use often have a crocodile clip for the ground connection.

In addition to wrist straps, ankle and heel straps are used in industry to bleed away accumulated charge from a body. These devices are usually not tethered to earth ground, but instead incorporate high resistance in their construction, and work by dissipating electrical charge to special floor tiles. Such straps are used when workers need to be mobile in a work area and a grounding cable would get in the way. They are used particularly in an operating theatre, where oxygen or explosive anesthetic gases are used.

Some wrist straps are "wireless" or "dissipative", and claim to protect against ESD without needing a ground wire, typically by air ionization or corona discharge. These are widely regarded as ineffective, if not fraudulent, and examples have been tested and shown not to work. Professional ESD standards all require wired wrist straps.

== See also ==
- Electrostatic-sensitive device
- Antistatic agent
- Electrostatics
- Bleeder resistor
