= De Jussieu family =

French family known for the botanists it produced

De Jussieu, the name of a French family which came into prominence towards the close of the sixteenth century, and was known for a century and a half for the botanists it produced. The following are its more eminent members:

- Antoine de Jussieu (1686–1758), born in Lyon on 6 July 1686, was the son of Christophe de Jussieu (or Dejussieu), an apothecary of some repute, who published a Nouveau traité de la thériaque (1708). Antoine studied at the University of Montpellier, and travelled with his brother Bernard through Spain, Portugal, and southern France. He went to Paris in 1708; J. P. de Tournefort, whom he succeeded at the Jardin des Plantes, dying in that year. His own original publications are not of marked importance, but he edited an edition of Tournefort's Institutiones rei herbariae (3 vols., 1719), and also a posthumous work of Jacques Barrelier, Plantae per Galliam, Hispaniam, et Italiam observatae, &c. (1714). He practised medicine, chiefly devoting himself to the very poor. He died in Paris on 22 April 1758.
- Bernard de Jussieu (1699–1777), a younger brother of the above, was born in Lyon on 17 August 1699. He took a medical degree at Montpellier and began practice in 1720, but finding the work uncongenial he gladly accepted his brother's invitation to Paris in 1722, when he succeeded Sebastien Vaillant as sub-demonstrator of plants in the Jardin du Roi. In 1725 he brought out a new edition of Tournefort's Histoire des Plantes qui naissent aux environs de Paris, 2 vols., which was afterwards translated into English by John Martyn, the original work being incomplete. In the same year he was admitted into the Académie des sciences, and communicated several papers to that body. Long before Abraham Trembley (1700–1784) published his Histoire des polypes d'eau douce, Jussieu maintained the doctrine that these organisms were animals, and not the flowers of marine plants, then the current notion; and to confirm his views he made three journeys to the coast of Normandy. Singularly modest and retiring, he published very little, but in 1759 he arranged the plants in the royal garden of the Trianon at Versailles, according to his own scheme of classification. This arrangement is printed in his nephew's Genera, and formed the basis of that work. He cared little for the credit of enunciating new discoveries, so long as the facts were made public. On the death of his brother Antoine, he could not be induced to succeed him in his office, but prevailed upon L. G. Lemonnier to assume the higher position. He died in Paris on 6 November 1777.
- Joseph de Jussieu (1704–1779), brother of Antoine and Bernard, was born in Lyon on 3 September 1704. Educated like the rest of the family for the medical profession, he accompanied C. M. de la Condamine to Peru, in the expedition for measuring an arc of the meridian, and remained in South America for thirty-six years, returning to France in 1771. Amongst the seeds he sent to his brother Bernard were those of Heliotropium arborescens, then first introduced into Europe. He died in Paris on 11 April 1779.
- Antoine Laurent de Jussieu (1748–1836), nephew of the three preceding, was born in Lyon on 12 April 1748. Called to Paris by his uncle Bernard, and carefully trained by him for the pursuits of medicine and botany, he largely profited by the opportunities afforded him. Gifted with a tenacious memory, and the power of quickly grasping the salient points of subjects under observation, he steadily worked at the improvement of that system of plant arrangement which had been sketched out by his uncle. In 1789 was issued his Genera piantarum secundum ordines naturales disposita, juxta methodum in horto regio Parisiensi exaratam. This volume formed the basis of modern classification; more than this, it is certain that Georges Cuvier derived much help in his zoological classification from its perusal. Hardly had the last sheet passed through the press, when the French Revolution broke out, and the author was installed in charge of the hospitals of Paris. The Museum d'histoire naturelle was organized on its present footing mainly by him in 1793, and he selected for its library everything relating to natural history from the vast materials obtained from the convents then broken up. He continued as professor of botany there from 1770 to 1826, when his son Adrien succeeded him. Besides the Genera, he produced nearly sixty memoirs on botanical topics. He died in Paris on 17 September 1836.
- Adrien-Henri de Jussieu (1797–1853), son of Antoine Laurent, was born in Paris on 23 December 1797. He displayed the qualities of his family in his thesis for the degree of M.D., De Euphorbiacearum generibus medicisque earundem viribus tentamen, Paris, 1824. He was also the author of valuable contributions to botanical literature on the Rutaceae, Meliaceae and Malpighiaceae respectively, of Taxonomie in the Dictionnaire universelle d'histoire naturelle, and of an introductory work styled simply Botanique, which reached nine editions, and was translated into the principal languages of Europe. He also edited his father's Introductio in Historiam Plantarum, issued at Paris, without imprint or date, it being a fragment of the intended second edition of the Genera, which Antoine Laurent did not live to complete. He died in Paris on 29 June 1853, leaving two daughters. He was the last of the great botanists of this de Jussieu dynasty.
- Laurent-Pierre De Jussieu (1792–1866), miscellaneous writer, nephew of Antoine Laurent, was born at Villeurbanne on 7 February 1792. His Simon de Nantua, ou le marchand forain (1818), reached fifteen editions, and was translated into seven languages. He also wrote Simpies notions de physique et d'histoire naturelle (1857), and a few geological papers. He died at Passy on 23 February 1866.
- Alexis de Jussieu (1802–1865), advocat, brother of Laurent-Pierre, was born on 17 August 1802. He was the editor of Le Courrier français. He died in Saint-Nizier-sous-Charlieu, Ain on 25 October 1865.
