= Antoine Laurent de Jussieu =

French botanist noted for the concept of plant families (1748–1836)

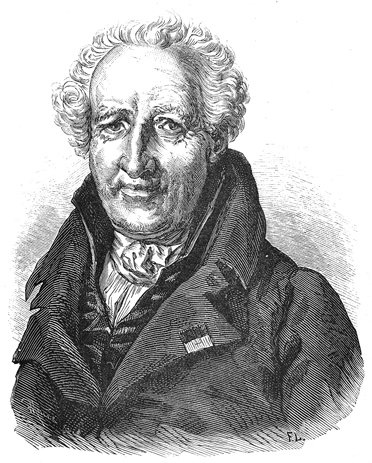
- Sketch portrait, probably by Jules Pizzetta.
- Born: 12 April 1748; Lyon, Kingdom of France
- Died: 17 September 1836 (aged 88); Paris, Kingdom of France
- Known for: Classification of flowering plants
- Scientific career
- Fields: Botany
- Workplaces: Jardin des Plantes, Muséum national d'histoire naturelle
- Author abbrev. (botany): Juss.
- Children: Adrien-Henri de Jussieu (Son)
- Relatives: Antoine de Jussieu (Uncle); Bernard de Jussieu (Uncle); Joseph de Jussieu (Uncle)

Signature
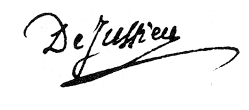

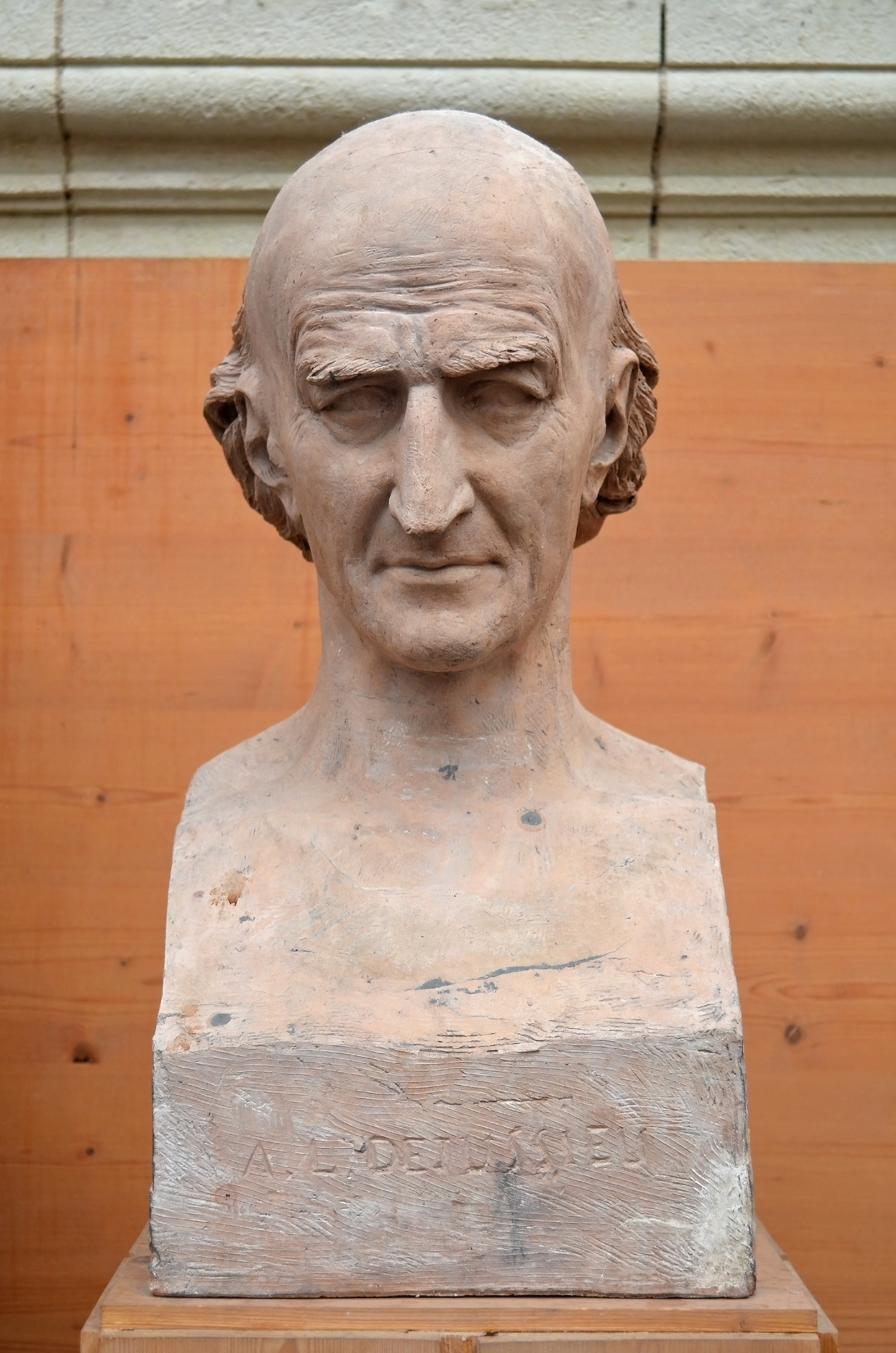
Bust of Antoine-Laurent de Jussieu by David d'Angers (1837)

Antoine Laurent de Jussieu (French pronunciation: [ɑ̃twan loʁɑ̃ də ʒysjø]; 12 April 1748 – 17 September 1836) was a French botanist, notable as the first to publish a natural classification of flowering plants; much of his system remains in use today. His classification was based on an extended unpublished work by his uncle, the botanist Bernard de Jussieu.

== Life ==
Jussieu was born in Lyon, France, in 1748, as one of 10 children, to Christophe de Jussieu, an amateur botanist. His father's three younger brothers were also botanists. He went to Paris in 1765 to be with his uncle Bernard and to study medicine, graduating with a doctorate in 1770, with a thesis on animal and vegetable physiology. His uncle introduced him to the Jardin du Roi, where he was appointed as a botany Demonstrator and deputy to L. G. Le Monnier, professor of botany there in 1770. Le Monnier had succeeded Antoine-Laurent's uncle Antoine in 1759. Lectures by eminent botanists, including the Jusssieu dynasty were popular there, especially among pharmacists.

Jusssieu's lecture on the classification of Ranunculaceae in 1773 to the Académie des Sciences led to his election as a member that year. In 1784 he was appointed to a Royal Commission by Louis XVI, as one of five commissionaires to investigate animal magnetism, publishing a dissenting opinion from the majority, suggesting further investigation was required.

The publication of Jussieu's Genera plantarum in 1789 was rapidly followed by the outbreak of the French Revolution (1789–1799). Jussieu adhered to the revolutionary principles, and was appointed to a position in the municipal government of Paris, where he had the task of managing all the hospitals.

Following the overthrow of the monarchy, the Jardin du Roi ("Garden of the King") was renamed the Jardin des plantes ("Garden of the plants"). Jussieu was instrumental in reorganizing the Jardin as the Muséum national d'histoire naturelle in 1790, where he became a professor of botany, holding the chair in Botanique à la campagne. He was also Director of the museum from 1794 to 1795, and again from 1798 to 1800. Jussieu immediately set about setting up a herbarium, a task greatly facilitated by the seizure of foreign collections by the revolutionary armies, and by the confiscation of the assets of the church and aristocracy. In 1808, Napoleon appointed him to the position of counsellor of the university.

Jusssieu remained at the museum until 1826, when he was succeeded by his son Adrien-Henri. At the museum he published many papers in the museum's annals (Annales du Museum d'histoire naturelle 1802–1813) and its succeeding Mémoires du Muséum d'histoire naturelle (1815–), as well as contributing articles to Frederic Cuvier's Dictionnaire des sciences naturelles (1816–1830). He was also a member of the Masonic Lodge, Les Neuf Sœurs.

== Work ==
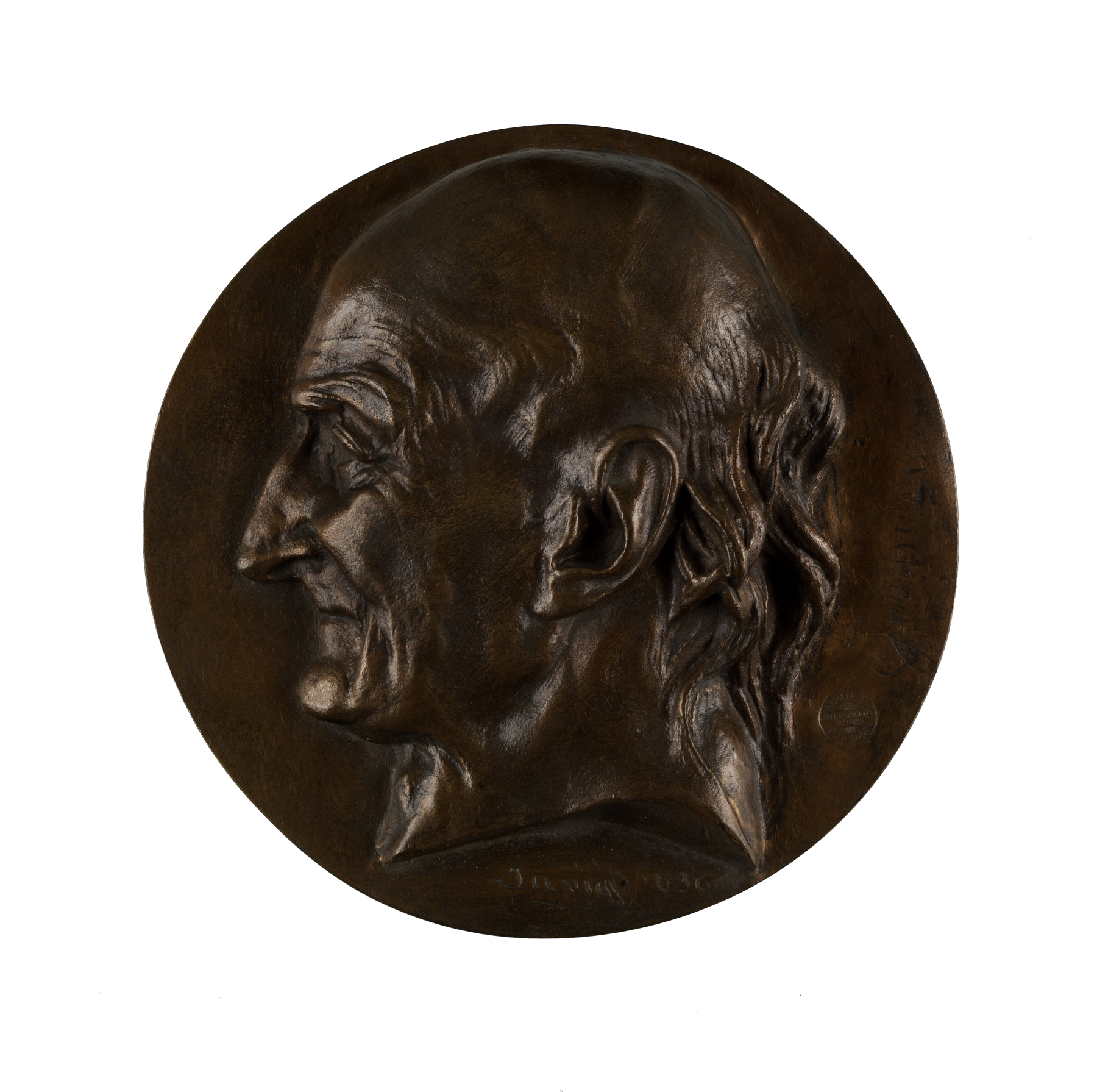
Medallion of Jussieu by David d'Angers 1836

Jussieu's system of plant classification, based on the relative value of their characteristics, served as the basis for natural systems of taxonomy. His system was first published in a paper on Ranunculaceae in 1773. The following year he developed the concept further in a paper on the arrangement of plants in the Jardin de Roi, based on the work of his uncle Bernard at the Trianon garden in Versaille. The work dealt primarily with suprafamilial ranks of classification.

Jussieu devoted the next five years to applying his ideas to the entire plant kingdom, culminating in his epochal work, the Genera plantarum (1789). In preparing this work he had access to a large number of herbaria and botanical gardens. Although at first British and German botanists, firm adherents of the Linnaean system, were wary of what they considered radical ideas emanating from the French revolution, the work soon gained wide acceptance in scientific circles, and was actively promoted by eminent botanists including Robert Brown and A. P. de Candolle.

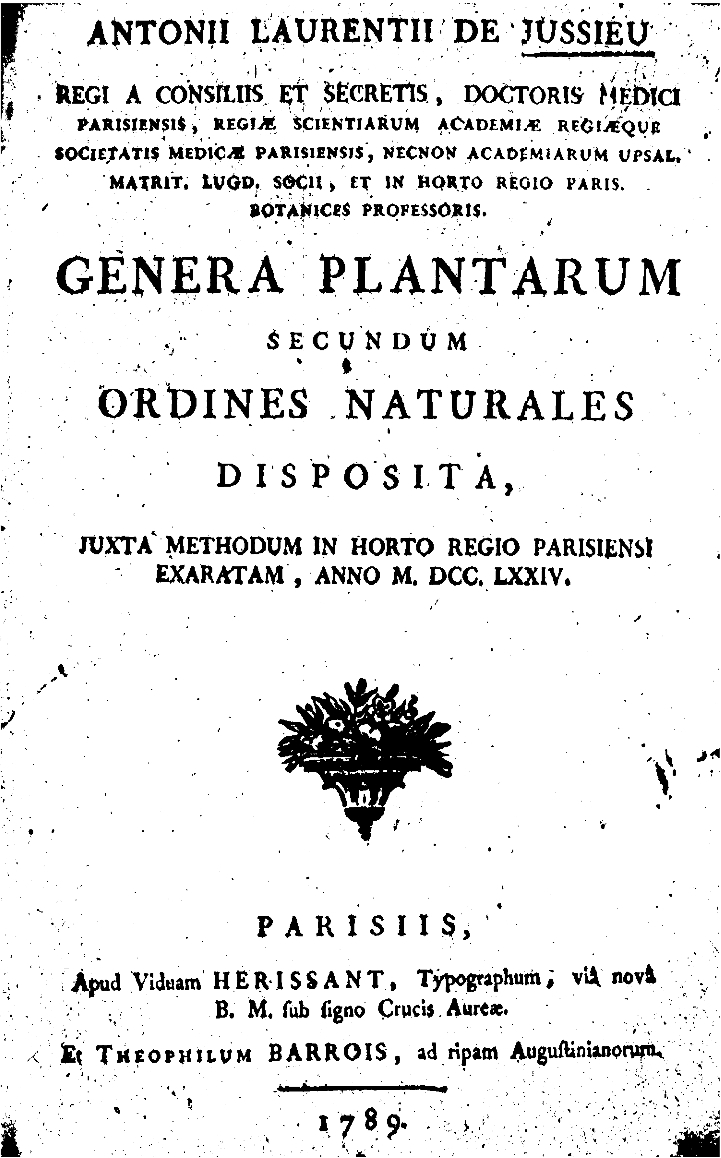
Title page of Genera plantarum 1789

In the Genera plantarum (1789), Jussieu adopted a methodology based on the use of multiple characters to define groups, an idea derived from naturalist Michel Adanson. This was a significant improvement over the "artificial" system of Linnaeus, whose most popular work classified plants into classes and orders based on the number of stamens and pistils, though Jussieu did keep Linnaeus' binomial nomenclature. He extended his uncle's ideas about the value of the characteristics of plants. These characteristics were considered to be of unequal value, with some subordinate to others in a hierarchical system. As Jusssieu put it, plant characteristics should be pesés et non comptés (weighed, not counted), in assigning each to a definite group. The names he gave to his uncle's three major groupings were Acotyledon, Monocotyledon, and Dicotyledon. These were then divided into fifteen classes and one hundred families. The most important features of the Genera plantarum are the division into groups and the description and circumscription of the 100 families (ordines naturales). With the resumption of his scientific work at the museum, Jussieu's publications (some 60 memoirs) largely dealt with further elaborating the principles of the Genera plantarum and more detailed circumscription and description of the families he had named, work that was very much influenced by Joseph Gärtner. Although he worked on a second edition of Genera plantarum, all that was published was his Introductio, posthumously in 1837.

=== List of selected publications ===
Sources: Flourens (1840, p. lvii); Pritzel (1872); Royal Society (1800–1900)Stafleu & Cowan (1979)

- 1770 : Jussieu, Antoine (1770). An aeconomiam animalem inter et vegetalem analogiae ou Comparaison de la structure et des fonctions des organes végétaux avec les phénomènes de la vie animale (Doctor of Medicine). Faculté de médecine de Paris.
- 1773 : — (1777). "Examen de la famille des renonculacées". Histoire de l'Académie Royale des Sciences (in French). Année 1773: 214–240.(also available here)
- 1774 : — (1778). "Exposition d'un nouvel ordre de plantes adopté dans les démonstrations du Jardin royal". Histoire de l'Académie Royale des Sciences (in French). Année 1774: 175–179.
- 1784 : — (1784). Rapport de l'un des commissaires chargés par le Roi de l'examen du magnétisme animal [Report of one of the commissioners charged by the King with the examination of animal magnetism] (in French). Paris: Veuve Hérissant.
- 1789 : Jussieu, Antoine Laurent de (1789). Genera plantarum: secundum ordines naturales disposita, juxta methodum in Horto regio parisiensi exaratam, anno M.DCC.LXXIV [Genera of Plants Arranged According to Their Natural Orders, Based on the Method Devised in the Royal Garden in Paris in the Year 1774] (in Latin). Paris. OCLC 5161409.(translated into French, with revisions, by Ventenat (1799) as Tableau du règne végétal selon la méthode de Jussieu)
- Jussieu, Antoine Laurent de (1964). "Introduction". In Stafleu, Frans Antonie (ed.). Genera Plantarum. Historiæ naturalis classica XXXV. Weinheim: J. Cramer. pp. vi–xlvii. OCLC 315729.
- 1804: Jussieu, Antoine Laurent de (1804). "Memoire sur le cantua, genre de plantes de la famille des Polemoniees". Annales du Muséum d'histoire naturelle (in French). 3: 113–119.
- 1810: Jussieu, Antoine Laurent de (1810). "Memoire sur les genres de plantes à ajouter ou retrancher aux familles des Solanées, Borraginées, Convolulacées, Polemoniacées, Bignoniées, Gentianées, Apocinées, Sapotées et Ardisiacées". Annales du Muséum d'histoire naturelle (in French). 15: 336–356.
- 1824: Jussieu, Antoine Laurent de (1824). Principes de la méthode naturelle des végétaux (in French). Paris: F.G. Levrault., reprinted from F. Cuvier, ed., Dictionnaire des sciences naturelles, 30: 426–468 (1824)
- 1837 : Jussieu, Antoine (1837). "Introductio in historiam plantarum". Annales des Sciences Naturelles (in Latin). 8: 97–160, 193–239.(Reprinted in Brongniart (1837, pp. 1–111)) op. post.

Recurrent publications

- Notice historique sur le Museum d’histoire naturelle, in Annales du Museum d’histoire naturelle, 1 (1802), 1–14; 2 (1803), 1–16; 3 (1804), 1–17; 4 (1804), 1–19; 6 (1805), 1-20; 11 (1808), 1-41

== Awards and memberships ==
Member of the French Académie des Sciences (1773), elected foreign member of the Royal Swedish Academy of Sciences (1788).

== Legacy ==
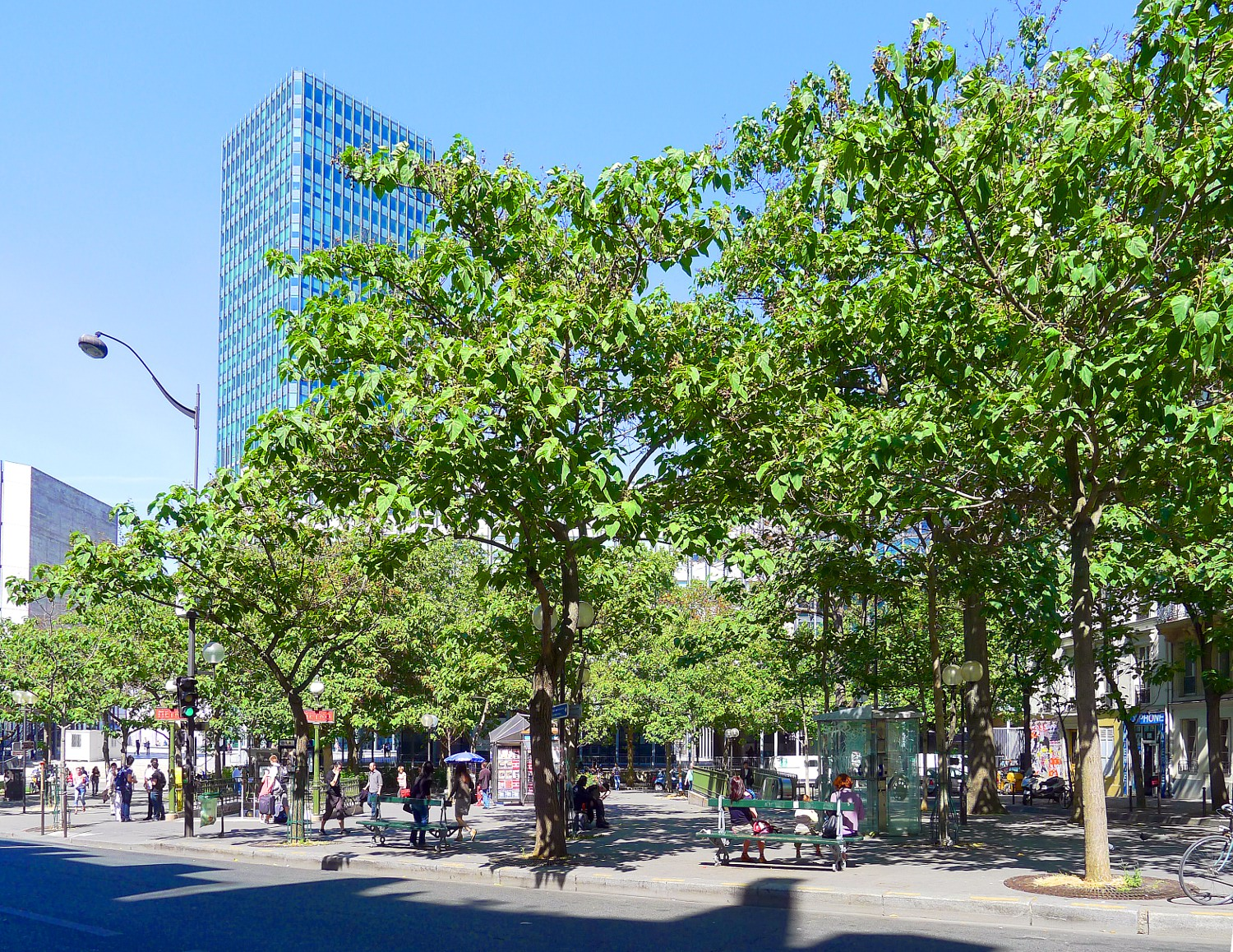
Place Jussieu, Paris

Jussieu's "natural" system of classification soon replaced the artificial sexual one of Linnaeus. The system of suprageneric nomenclature in botany is officially dated to 4 August 1789 with the publication of the Genera Plantarum (Gen. Pl.). The Genera plantarum was far-reaching in its impact; many of the present-day plant families are still attributed to Jussieu. Morton's 1981 History of botanical science counts 76 of Jussieu's families conserved in the ICBN, versus just 11 for Linnaeus, for instance. Writing of the natural system, Sydney Howard Vines remarked:

"The glory of this crowning achievement belongs to Jussieu: he was the capable man who appeared precisely at the psychological moment, and it is the men that so appear who have made, and will continue to make, all the great generalisations of science."

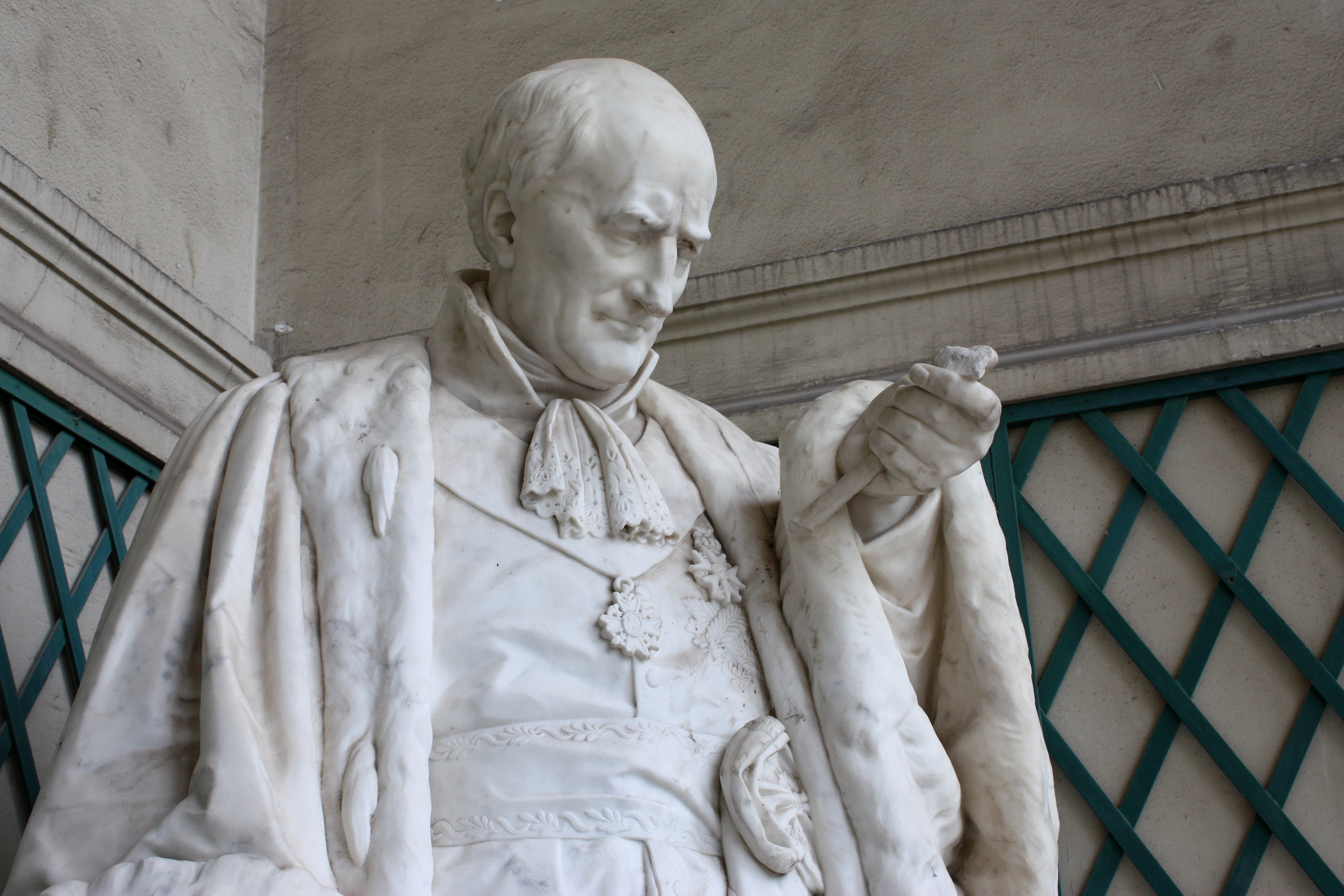
Jussieu by Héral in Jardin des Plantes

De Jussieu and his family have been commemorated by a number of images, including a bust and medallion by David d'Angers (Pierre-Jean David), upon his death. A statue of Jussieu, commissioned for 10,000 Fr by Jean-François Legendre-Héral in 1842, stands in the Galerie de Botanique of the Jardin des Plantes. Another, by Jean-Baptiste Gustave Deloye is on the balustrade of the Natural History Museum, Vienna (facing Maria-Theresien-Platz). The Jussieu botanical dynasty is commemorated in the neighbourhood of the Jardin des Plantes by the Place Jussieu (Quartier Saint-Victor, 5th arrondissement), Rue Jussieu, the Jussieu metro station and the Jussieu science campus of the University of Paris. (Note: Place Jussieu: Created in 1838 as Place Saint-Victor, and renamed in 1867, between Rue Jussieu and Rue Linné, thus commemorating two botanists, adjacent to the Jussieu campus) The Jussieu family are also commemorated by street names in Marseille and Lyon, their family home. The Jussieu Peninsula in South Australia is also named after Antoine Laurent Jussieu, as is an asteroid.

== See also ==
- De Jussieu system – Late 18th century system of plant taxonomy
- History of botany
- Royal Commission on Animal Magnetism – 1784 French scientific bodies' investigations involving systematic controlled trials
- Category:Taxa named by Antoine Laurent de Jussieu

== Bibliography ==
=== Books ===
- Hahn, Roger (1971). The Anatomy of a Scientific Institution: The Paris Academy of Sciences, 1666-1803. University of California Press. ISBN 978-0-520-01818-1.
- Isely, Duane (1994). One Hundred and One Botanists. Ames: Iowa State University Press. pp. 118–120. ISBN 0-8138-2498-2.
- Jaussaud, Philippe; Brygoo, Edouard Raoul, eds. (2004). Du Jardin au Muséum en 516 biographies (in French). Museum national d'histoire naturelle. ISBN 978-2-85653-565-3.(Open Access)
- Stafleu, Frans A.; Cowan, Richard S. (1979). "Jussieu, Antoine Laurent de (1748-1836)". Taxonomic literature: a selective guide to botanical publications and collections with dates, commentaries and types. 15 vol. Vol. 2. H–Le (2nd ed.). Utrecht: Bohn, Scheltema & Holkema. pp. 477–479. ISBN 9789031302246.
- Stevens, Peter Francis (1994). The Development of Biological Systematics: Antoine-Laurent de Jussieu, Nature, and the Natural System. Columbia University Press. ISBN 978-0231515085.
- Vines, Sydney Howard (1913). "Robert Morison 1620—1683 and John Ray 1627—1705". In Oliver, Francis Wall (ed.). Makers of British botany. Cambridge University Press. pp. 8–43.
- Morton, Alan G (1981). History of Botanical Science: An Account of the Development of Botany from Ancient Times to the Present Day. Academic Press. ISBN 0-12-508380-7.(available here at Internet Archive)

==== Historical sources ====
- Brongniart, Adolphe (1837). Notice historique sur Antoine-Laurent de Jussieu (in French). Paris.(Reprinted from Annales des sciences naturelles. Botanique, 2nd series, VII January 1837, p. 5)
- Du Mortier, Barthélemy (1862–1873). Opuscules de botanique (in French). Brussels: G. Mayolez.(also at Google Books here)
- Cuvier, Frédéric, ed. (1816–1845). Dictionnaire des sciences naturelles, dans lequel on traite méthodiquement des différens êtres de la nature, considérés soit en eux-mêmes, d'après l'état actuel de nos connoissances, soit relativement à l'utilité qu'en peuvent retirer la médecine, l'agriculture, le commerce et les artes. Suivi d'une biographie des plus célèbres naturalistes. 61 vols (in French). Paris: F. G. Levrault.
- Lazare, Félix; Lazare, Louis (1855) [1844]. Dictionnaire administratif et historique des rues de Paris et de ses monuments (in French) (2nd ed.). Paris: Bureau de revue municipale.(see Dictionnaire administratif et historique des rues de Paris et de ses monuments)
- Pritzel, G. A. (1872). Thesaurus literaturae botanicae omnium gentium, inde a rerum botanicarum initiis ad nostra usque tempora, quindecim millia operum recensens. Lipsiae: F. A. Brockhaus. p. 160.
- Rádl, Emanuel (1909–1913). Geschichte der biologischen Theorien in der Neuzeit (in German) (2nd ed.). Leipzig: Verlag von W. Engelmann.
- Sachs, Julius von (1890) [1875]. Geschichte der Botanik vom 16. Jahrhundert bis 1860 [History of botany (1530-1860)]. translated by Henry E. F. Garnsey, revised by Isaac Bayley Balfour. Oxford: Oxford University Press. doi:10.5962/bhl.title.30585., (see also History of botany (1530-1860) at Google Books)
- Annales du Muséum d'histoire naturelle. 21 vols. Paris: G. Dufour. 1802–1827.
- Royal Society (1800–1900). "Jussieu, Ant. Laur. de.". Catalogue of scientific papers. 17 vols. Vol. 3 (1800-1863) GRE–LEZ 1869. Eyre & Spottiswoode. pp. 596–598.(also here at Google Books. See also Catalogue of Scientific Papers)

=== Articles ===
- Brongniart, Adolphe (1837a). "Notice historique sur Antoine-Laurent de Jussieu". Annales des sciences naturelles. Botanique. 2nd series VIII: 5–24.(Reprinted in Brongniart (1837))
- Duveen, Denis I.; Klickstein, Herbert S. (December 1955). "Benjamin Franklin (1706–1790) and Antoine Laurent Lavoisier (1743–1794): Part II. Joint investigations". Annals of Science. 11 (4): 271–302. doi:10.1080/00033795500200295.
- Flourens, Pierre (1840). "Éloge historique d'Antoine-Laurent de Jussieu 1838". Mémoires de l'Académie (royale) des sciences de l'Institut (imperial) de France. XVII: i–lx.(Reprint available in Google Books)
- Burdet, H M (1976). "Cartulae ad botanicorum graphicem VIII". Candollea (in French). 31 (1): 127–158.
- Guédès, Michel (May 1973). "Duchesne, Buisson, Durande, early followers of the natural method of the Jussieus". Taxon. 22 (2–3): 211–219. Bibcode:1973Taxon..22..211G. doi:10.2307/1218125. JSTOR 1218125.
- Lacroix, Alfred (1941). "Notice historique sur les cinq de Jussieu, membres de l'Académie des sciences (1712-1853), leur rôle d'animateurs des recherches d'histoire naturelle dans les colonies françaises, leurs principaux correspondants: lue en la séance publique annuelle du 21 décembre 1936". Mémoires de l'Académie des Sciences de l'Institut de France (in French). 2nd series 63: 34–47.
- Meerow, Alan W.; Reveal, James L.; Snijman, Deirdre A.; Dutilh, Julie H. (November 2007). "(1793) Proposal to conserve the name Amaryllidaceae against Alliaceae, a "superconservation" proposal". Taxon. 56 (4): 1299–1300. Bibcode:2007Taxon..56.1299M. doi:10.2307/25065925. JSTOR 25065925.

=== Encyclopaedias ===
- Stafleu, Frans A (2019). "Jussieu, Antoine-Laurent De". Dictionary of Scientific Biography. Gale.
- Rompel, Joseph (1910). "De Jussieu". In Herbermann, Charles (ed.). Catholic Encyclopedia. Vol. 8. New York: Robert Appleton Company.
- Promeet, Dutta (8 April 2021). Antoine-Laurent de Jussieu: French botanist. Encyclopædia Britannica.
- Chisholm, Hugh, ed. (1911). "Jussieu, De". Encyclopædia Britannica. Vol. 15 (11th ed.). Cambridge University Press. p. 593.

=== Websites ===
- "La place Jussieu - Paris 5e - Faculté Jussieu - Paris Diderot - Le Quartier Latin". Paris 1900 l'art nouveau. January 2005.
- van der Krogt, René; van der Krogt, Peter (2021). "Wien - Fassadenstatuen des Naturhistorisches Museums (Façade statues on the Museum of Natural History)". Statues - Hither & Thither.
