= Heladena =

Scientific classification
- Kingdom: Plantae
- Clade: Embryophytes
- Clade: Tracheophytes
- Clade: Spermatophytes
- Clade: Angiosperms
- Clade: Eudicots
- Clade: Rosids
- Order: Malpighiales
- Family: Malpighiaceae
- Genus: Heladena; A.Juss. (1840)

Species
- Heladena echinata (Griseb.) R.F.Almeida & M.Pell.; Heladena multiflora (Hook. & Arn.) Nied.

Synonyms
- Henlea Griseb. (1860), nom. illeg.; Henleophytum H.Karst. (1861); Malpigiantha Rojas Acosta (1897)

Genus of flowering plants

Heladena is a genus of flowering plants in the family Malpighiaceae. It includes two species native to the tropical Americas.

- Heladena echinata (Griseb.) R.F.Almeida & M.Pell. (synonym Henleophytum echinatum (Griseb.) Small) – Cuba
- Heladena multiflora (Hook. & Arn.) Nied. – Central Brazil, northeastern Argentina, Paraguay, and Uruguay.
