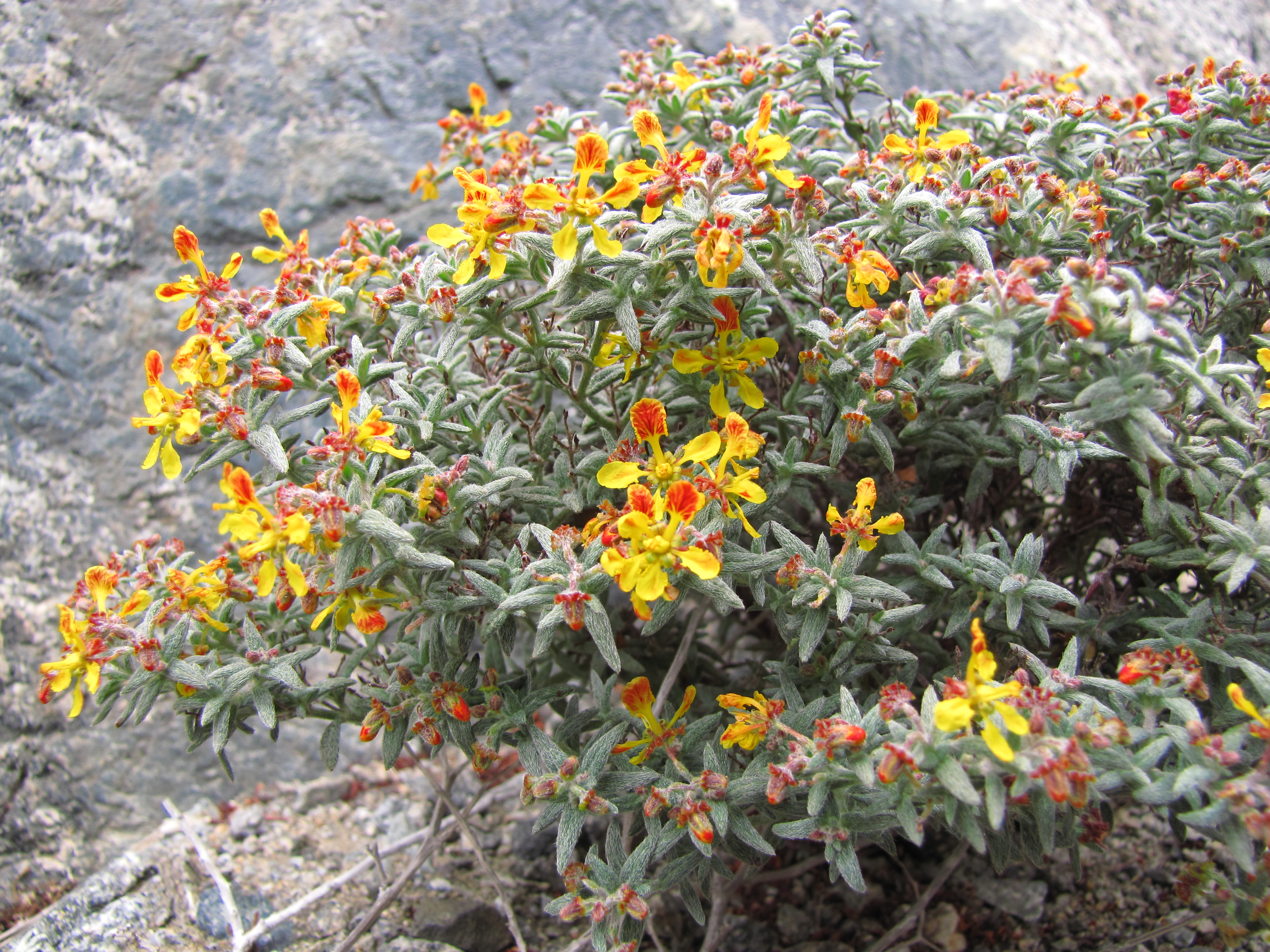
- Dinemandra ericoides

Scientific classification
- Kingdom: Plantae
- Clade: Tracheophytes
- Clade: Angiosperms
- Clade: Eudicots
- Clade: Rosids
- Order: Malpighiales
- Family: Malpighiaceae
- Genus: Dinemandra; A.Juss. ex Endl.

Synonyms
- Dinemagonum A.Juss.

= Dinemandra =

Genus of plants

Dinemandra is a genus of flowering plants belonging to the family Malpighiaceae. It includes two species of subshrubs endemic to northern and central Chile.

- Dinemandra ericoides A.Juss.
- Dinemandra gayana (A.Juss.) R.F.Almeida & M.Pell.
