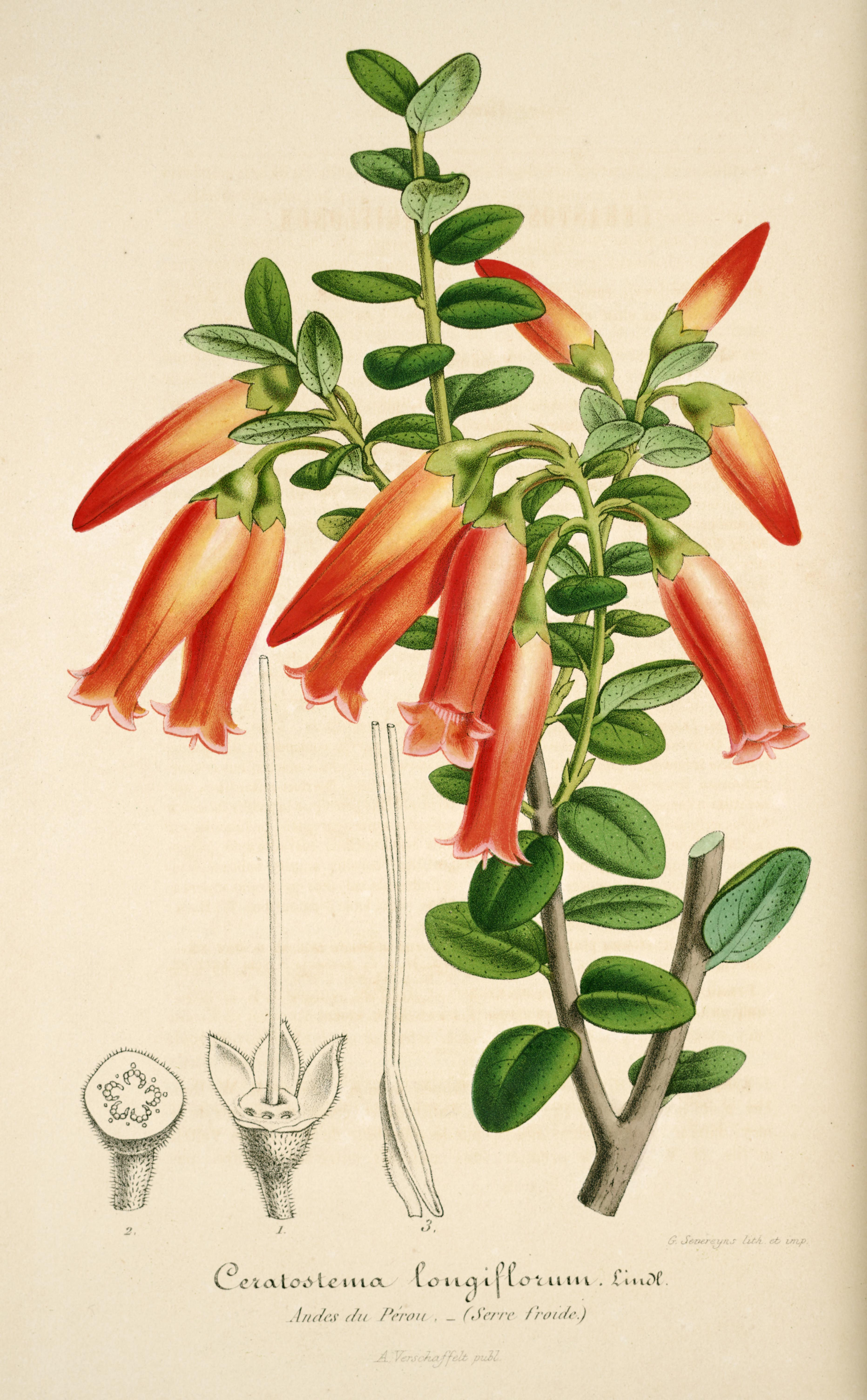
- Illustration of Ceratostema longiflorum

Scientific classification
- Kingdom: Plantae
- Clade: Embryophytes
- Clade: Tracheophytes
- Clade: Spermatophytes
- Clade: Angiosperms
- Clade: Eudicots
- Clade: Asterids
- Order: Ericales
- Family: Ericaceae
- Subfamily: Vaccinioideae
- Tribe: Vaccinieae
- Genus: Ceratostema; Juss.

Type species
- Ceratostema peruvianum Pers.

Synonyms
- Englerodoxa Hoerold; Siphonostema Griseb.

= Ceratostema =

Genus of flowering plants

Ceratostema is a genus of shrubs or dwarf shrubs and lianas in the heather family (Ericaceae) native to tropical South America.

== Description ==
=== Vegetative characteristics ===
Ceratostema are up to 3.5 m tall, terrestrial or epiphytic shrubs with petiolate, alternate, coriaceous leaves.

=== Generative characteristics ===
The axillary, solitary inflorescence bears pedicellate, inodorous, (4-)5(-6)-merous flowers.

== Taxonomy ==
It was described by Antoine Laurent de Jussieu in 1789. The type species is Ceratostema peruvianum Pers. Within the subfamily Vaccinioideae it is placed in the tribe Vaccinieae. It is closely related to Semiramisia.

=== Species ===
Image	Scientific name	Distribution
	Ceratostema agettiorum M.M.Jiménez & H.Garzón	Ecuador (Morona-Santiago)
	Ceratostema alatum (Hoerold) Sleumer	Colombia, Ecuador
	Ceratostema alexportillae A.Doucette, H.Medina & J.Portilla	Ecuador
	Ceratostema amplexicaule A.C.Sm.	Colombia, Ecuador
	Ceratostema auriculatum Luteyn	Ecuador (Zamora-Chinchipe)
	Ceratostema bracteolatum Luteyn	Ecuador (Azuay)
	Ceratostema callistum A.C.Sm.	Peru
	Ceratostema calycinum (A.C.Sm.) Sleumer	Ecuador
	Ceratostema charianthum A.C.Sm.	Ecuador
	Ceratostema cutucuense Luteyn	Ecuador (Morona-Santiago)
	Ceratostema doucettei H.Medina & J.Portilla	Ecuador.
	Ceratostema fasciculatum Luteyn	Ecuador.
	Ceratostema ferreyrae Luteyn	Peru
	Ceratostema gearyana M.M.Jiménez & H.Garzón	Ecuador
	Ceratostema glandipedicellata Cornejo & Luteyn	Ecuador
	Ceratostema glandulifera Maguire, Steyerm. & Luteyn	Venezuela.
	Ceratostema glans Luteyn	Ecuador (Morona-Santiago)
	Ceratostema guachizacae Maguire, Steyerm. & Luteyn	Ecuador
	Ceratostema gualaquizensis M.M.Jiménez & H.Garzón	Ecuador (Morona-Santiago)
	Ceratostema ingridportillae A.Doucette, H.Medina & J.Portilla	Ecuador
	Ceratostema ivanportillae A.Doucette, H.Medina & J.Portilla	Ecuador
	Ceratostema jorgebritoi M.M.Jiménez & h.Garzón	Ecuador (Morona-Santiago)
	Ceratostema josecaamanoi A.Doucette, H.Medina & J.Portilla	Ecuador
	Ceratostema kiatianum A.Doucette, H.Medina & J.Portilla	Ecuador
	Ceratostema lanceolatum Benth.	Ecuador (Loja)
	Ceratostema lanigerum (Sleumer) Luteyn	Ecuador.
	Ceratostema limonensis M.M.Jiménez & H.Garzón	Ecuador.
	Ceratostema loranthiflorum Benth.	Ecuador.
	Ceratostema loucianae Cornejo, G. Tello & Luteyn	Ecuador (Morona-Santiago)
	Ceratostema macbrydiorum Luteyn	Ecuador (Morona-Santiago)
	Ceratostema madisonii Luteyn	Ecuador (Morona-Santiago)
	Ceratostema megabracteatum Luteyn	Ecuador
	Ceratostema megalobum Luteyn	Ecuador (Loja)
	Ceratostema moronasantiagoensis M.M.Jiménez & H.Garzón	Ecuador
	Ceratostema nodosum Luteyn	Ecuador
	Ceratostema nubigena (A.C.Sm.) A.C.Sm.	Ecuador
	Ceratostema oellgaardii Luteyn	Ecuador (Loja)
	Ceratostema oyacachiensis Luteyn	Ecuador (Napo)
	Ceratostema pedunculatum Luteyn	Ecuador (Zamora-Chinchipe)
	Ceratostema pendens Luteyn	Ecuador (Morona-Santiago)
	Ceratostema pepeportillae A.Doucette & H.Medina	Ecuador
	Ceratostema pensile (A.C.Sm.) A.C.Sm.	Ecuador (El Oro)
	Ceratostema peruvianum Pers.	Ecuador.
	Ceratostema prietoi A.C.Sm.	Ecuador (Cañar)
	Ceratostema pubescens Luteyn	Ecuador (El Oro)
	Ceratostema portillae Cornejo & Luteyn	Ecuador
	Ceratostema rauhii Luteyn	Peru.
	Ceratostema reginaldii (Sleumer) A.C.Sm.	Ecuador
	Ceratostema revolutum M.M.Jiménez, H.Garzón & Iturralde	Ecuador
	Ceratostema sieteiglesiana Garzón & M.M.Jiménez	Ecuador (Morona-Santiago)
	Ceratostema silvicola A.C.Sm.	Ecuador
	Ceratostema speciosum André	Ecuador.
	Ceratostema ventricosum A.C.Sm.	Ecuador
	Ceratostema zamorana M.M.Jiménez & Vélez-Abarca	Ecuador (Zamora-Chinchipe)

== Distribution and habitat ==
Ceratostema is native to Colombia, Ecuador, Guyana, Peru, and Venezuela.
