= Jean-François Legendre-Héral =

19th-century French sculptor

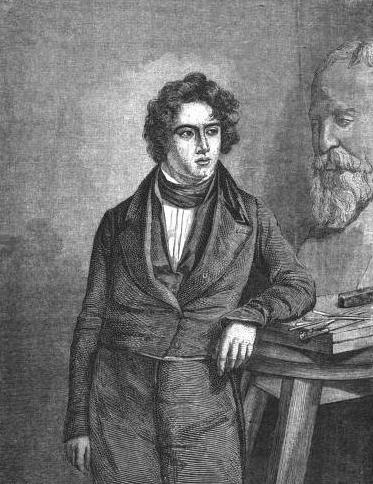
Jean-François Legendre-Héral, from La Semaine des familles (1863) by Jean-Marie Jacomin

Jean-François Legendre-Héral (French pronunciation: [ʒɑ̃ fʁɑ̃swa ləʒɑ̃dʁ eʁal]; 21 January 1796, Montpellier – 13 September 1851, Marcilly) was a French classical sculptor.

== Biography ==
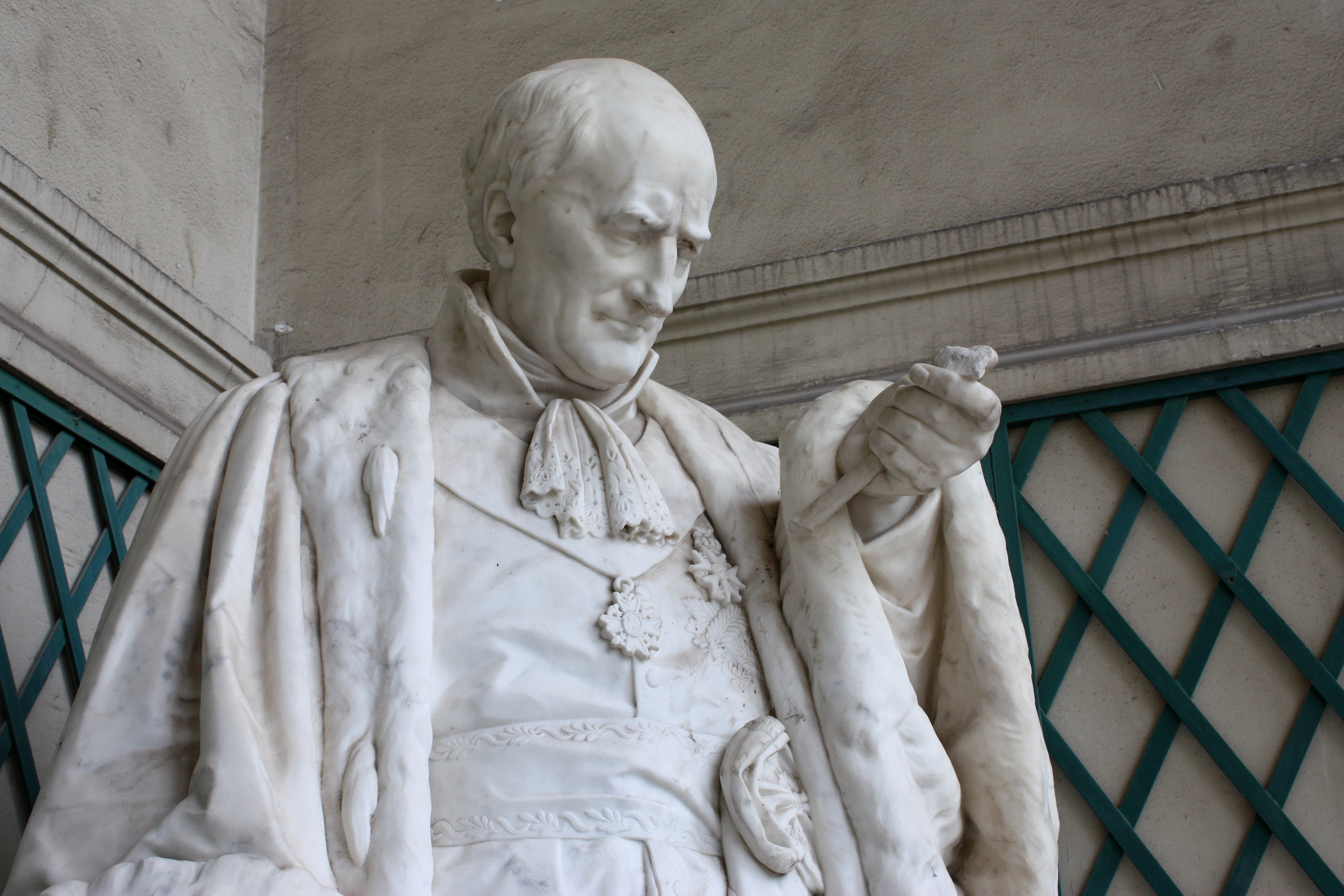
Statue of Antoine Laurent de Jussieu at the Jardin des Plantes

Jean-Francois Legendre-Heral was born on 21 January 1796 in Montpellier. His father was a postal worker. After his father's death, his mother married a musician, who introduced him to the arts. He was soon allowed to enroll in the École nationale des beaux-arts de Lyon, where he studied with Joseph Chinard and Joseph Charles Marin. In 1817, he obtained a grant from the city for a study trip to Rome. It was at this time that he added his step-father's name to his own to become Legendre-Héral.

During his stay there, his fellow sculptor James Pradier accused him of casting his sculptures from life; an accusation that would later become the source of rumours in Lyon and Paris, apparently spread by François Joseph Bosio. In 1819, he was named to a professorship at the École, where Jean-Marie Bonnassieux and Hippolyte Flandrin were among his first students.

In 1825, he went to Paris with a deputation from Hérault to work on implementing an equestrian statue of Louis XIV for his hometown of Montpellier. He took this opportunity to request an extended leave from the École. Three years later, he returned to Lyon.

He executed several major commissions for the City of Lyon. In 1837, he was named a Chevalier in the Legion d'Honneur. The following year, he resigned from his teaching position and moved to Paris, where he was awarded major government contracts for the Jardin des Plantes, Versailles and several churches. In his last years, he suffered from a disease of the spinal cord, ceased working, and retired to Marcilly.

His son, Charles, who served as a model for some of his father's best-known statues, married an American and emigrated to the United States in 1854, where he became a Union General during the Civil War, an ambassador to China and an advisor to the governments of Japan and Korea.

== Selected sculptures ==
An exhaustive list of his works may be found in the corresponding article on French Wikipedia

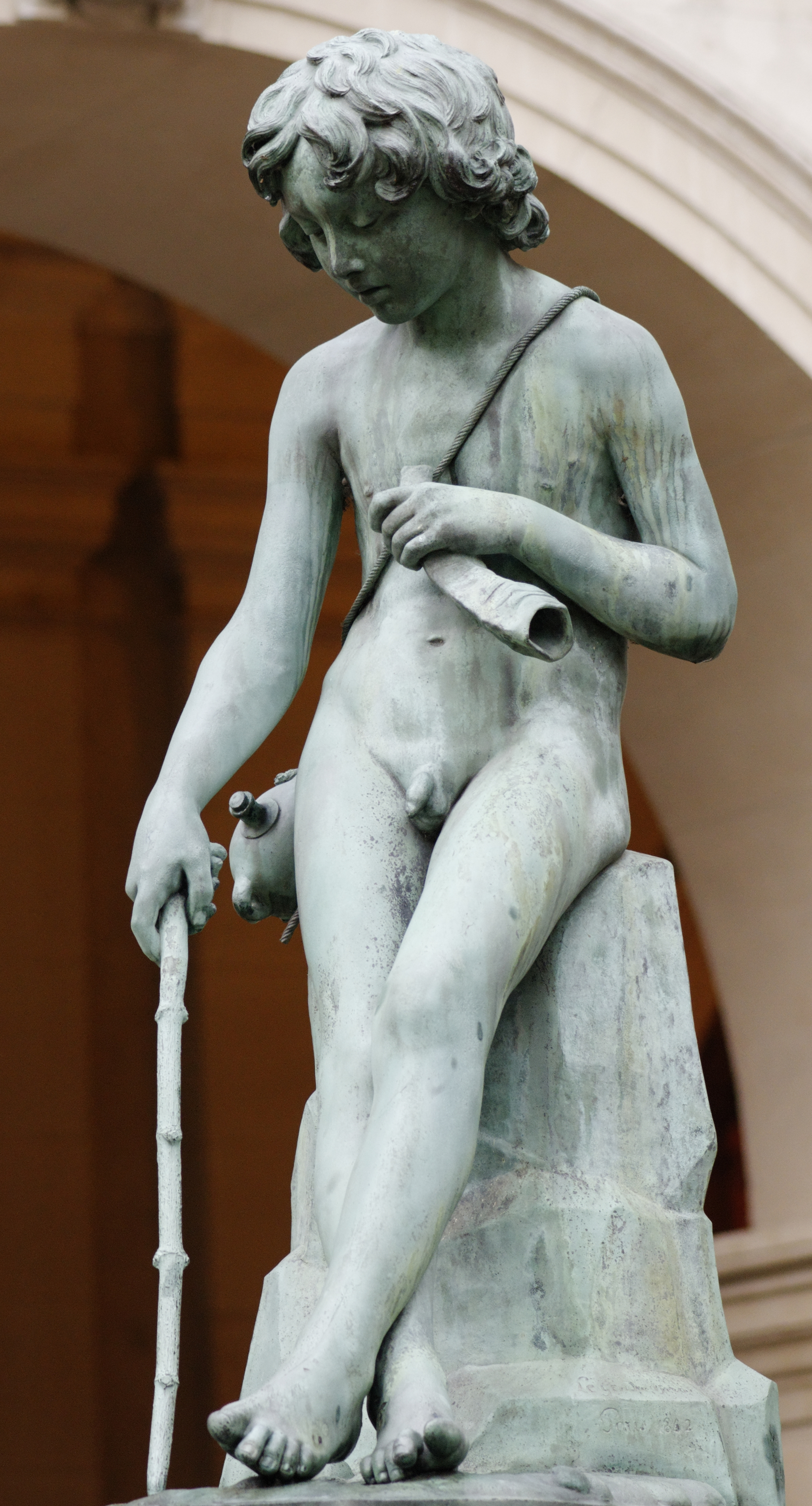
Giotto as a Child, Drawing in the Sand

- 1825, "Christ and the Twelve Apostles", a statuary ensemble originally part of the altar at the Royal Monastery of Brou. The seminary was closed in 1907 and the altar was acquired in 1939 by a local magistrate for 5,000 Francs. Two years later, it was placed in the new "Church of the Sacred Heart". It was dismantled in 1968.
- 1829, Henry IV, for the Hôtel de Ville (City Hall) of Lyon. The limestone was heavily damaged by air pollution and replaced by a cast in 1985. It is now on display at the Musée Gadagne
- 1830, "The Four Evangelists", lost during the restoration of the Église Saint-Paul in 1901.
- 1830s, Busts of Bernard de Jussieu, Pierre Puget, Nicolas Coustou, Philibert de l'Orme, Pierre Poivre, André Marie Constant Duméril and Camille de Tournon-Simiane.
- 1841, "Giotto enfant dessinant sur le sable", (Giotto as a Child, Drawing in the Sand), marble (Musée de Montpellier), bronze (garden of the Palais Saint-Pierre de Lyon), plaster (Musée de la Chartreuse de Douai).
- 1843, "Anne-Robert-Jacques Turgot", marble, Museum of Fine Arts of Lyon. A copy is in the Palais du Luxembourg.
- 1847, "The City of Lyon welcomes the Arts, Commerce, Industry and Agriculture", bas-relief at the entrance to the Palais de Justice de Lyon waiting room.
