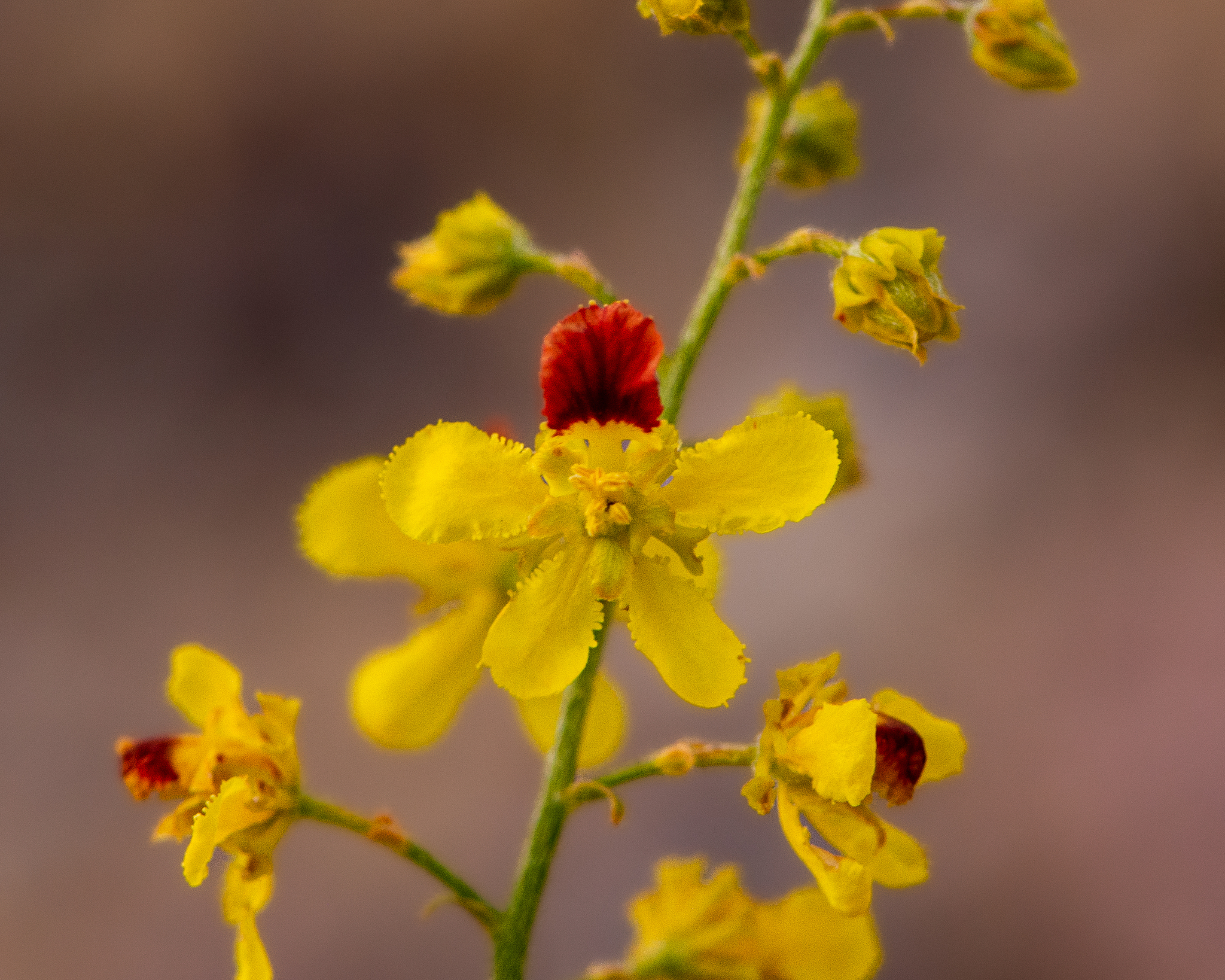

Scientific classification
- Kingdom: Plantae
- Clade: Tracheophytes
- Clade: Angiosperms
- Clade: Eudicots
- Clade: Rosids
- Order: Malpighiales
- Family: Malpighiaceae
- Genus: Dinemandra
- Species: D. gayana

Binomial name
- Dinemandra gayana (A.Juss.) R.F.Almeida & M.Pell. (2024)

Synonyms
- Dinemagonum albicaule Phil.; Dinemagonum bridgesianum A.Juss.; Dinemagonum bridgesianum f. glandulosobracteolata Nied.; Dinemagonum bridgesianum var. parvifolium Nied.; Dinemagonum gayanum A.Juss. (basionym); Dinemagonum gayanum var. albicaule (Phil.) Reiche; Dinemagonum gayanum var. bridgesianum (A.Juss.) Reiche; Dinemagonum maculigerum Phil.

= Dinemandra gayana =

Genus of plants

Dinemandra gayana is a species of flowering plant belonging to the family Malpighiaceae. It is a subshrub endemic to northern and central Chile from Atacama to Valparaíso regions, where it grows in deserts and dry shrublands.
