= Joseph de Jussieu =

French botanist and explorer

Joseph De Jussieu
- Born: 3 September 1704; Lyon
- Died: 11 April 1779 (aged 74); Paris
- Scientific career
- Fields: Botany
- Author abbrev. (botany): J.Juss.

Joseph de Jussieu (3 September 1704 – 11 April 1779), was a French botanist and explorer, member of the Jussieu family. He introduced the common garden heliotrope (Heliotropium arborescens) to European gardeners.

He was born in Lyon, and was the brother of Bernard and Antoine de Jussieu. He accompanied Charles Marie de La Condamine, Louis Godin and Pierre Bouguer on a voyage to South America in 1735, primarily to Ecuador with main aim to make astronomical sightings at the Equator to help establish shape of the Earth. He died in Paris, aged 74.

== See also ==
- De Jussieu family
