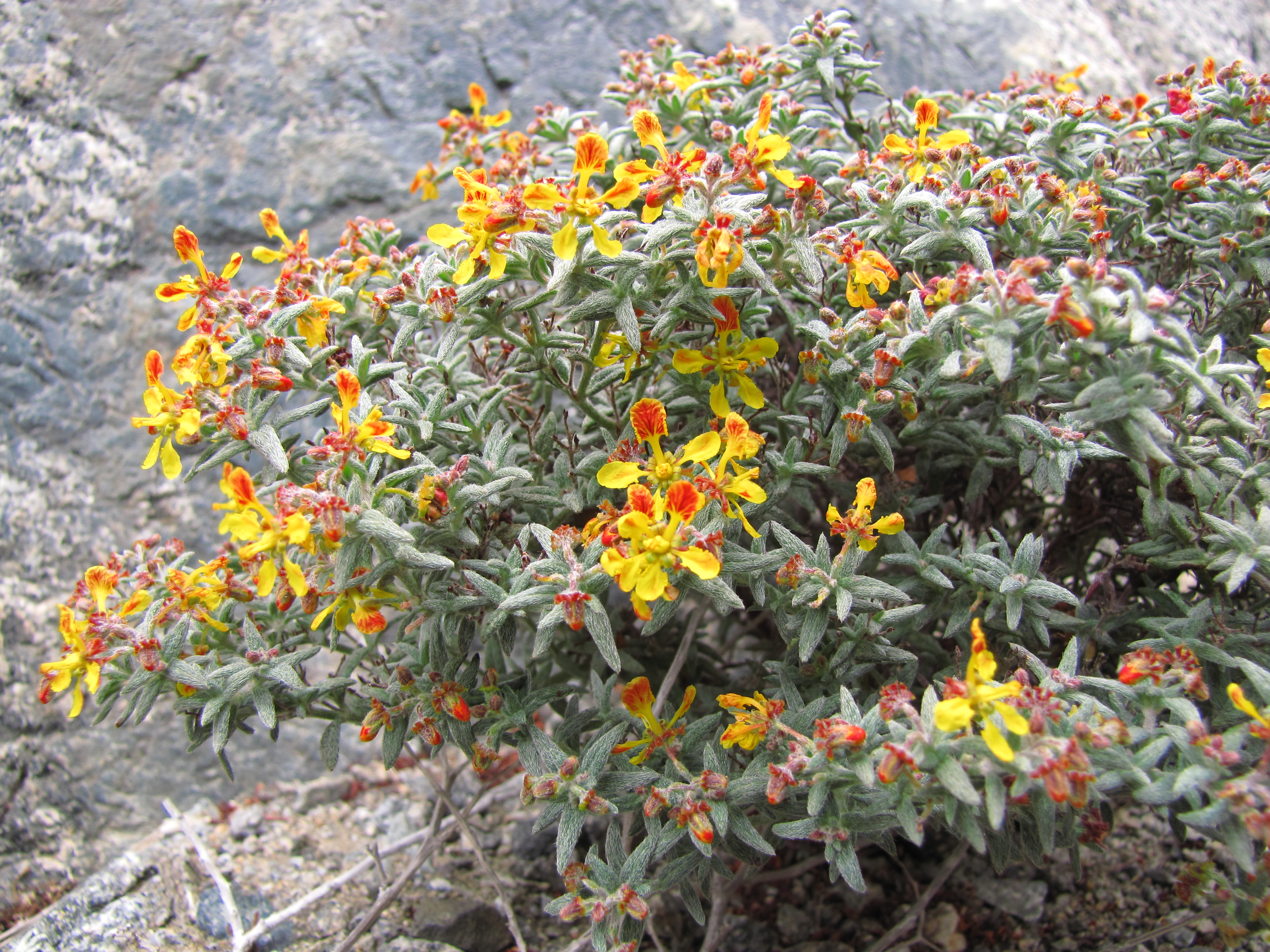
- Dinemandra ericoides

Scientific classification
- Kingdom: Plantae
- Clade: Tracheophytes
- Clade: Angiosperms
- Clade: Eudicots
- Clade: Rosids
- Order: Malpighiales
- Family: Malpighiaceae
- Genus: Dinemandra
- Species: D. ericoides

Binomial name
- Dinemandra ericoides A.Juss.

Synonyms
- Dinemandra ericoides var. triandra Nied.; Dinemandra glaberrima A.Juss.; Dinemandra ramosissima Phil.; Dinemandra strigosa Phil.; Dinemandra subaptera Phil.

= Dinemandra ericoides =

Species of flowering plant

Dinemandra ericoides is a species of flowering plant belonging to the family Malpighiaceae. It is a subshrub endemic to the Atacama Desert of Antofagasta and Atacama regions in northern Chile.
