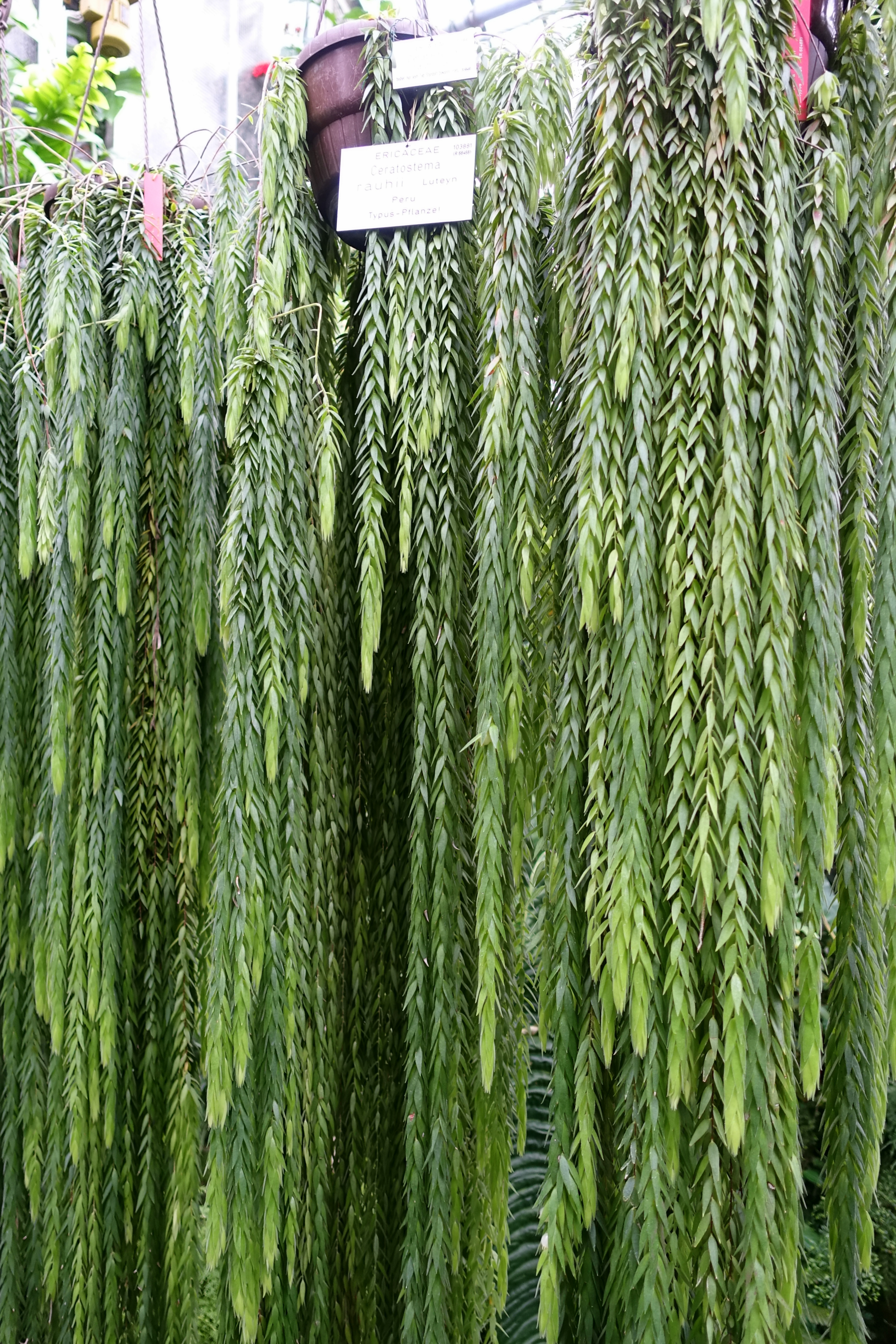

Conservation status
- Critically Endangered (IUCN 2.3)

Scientific classification
- Kingdom: Plantae
- Clade: Tracheophytes
- Clade: Angiosperms
- Clade: Eudicots
- Clade: Asterids
- Order: Ericales
- Family: Ericaceae
- Genus: Ceratostema
- Species: C. rauhii

Binomial name
- Ceratostema rauhii Luteyn 1992

= Ceratostema rauhii =

Species of plant

Ceratostema rauhii, is a species of Ceratostema found in Peru south east of Chiclayo at elevations around 2200 meters.
