= Institutiones rei herbariae =

17th-century botanical compendium

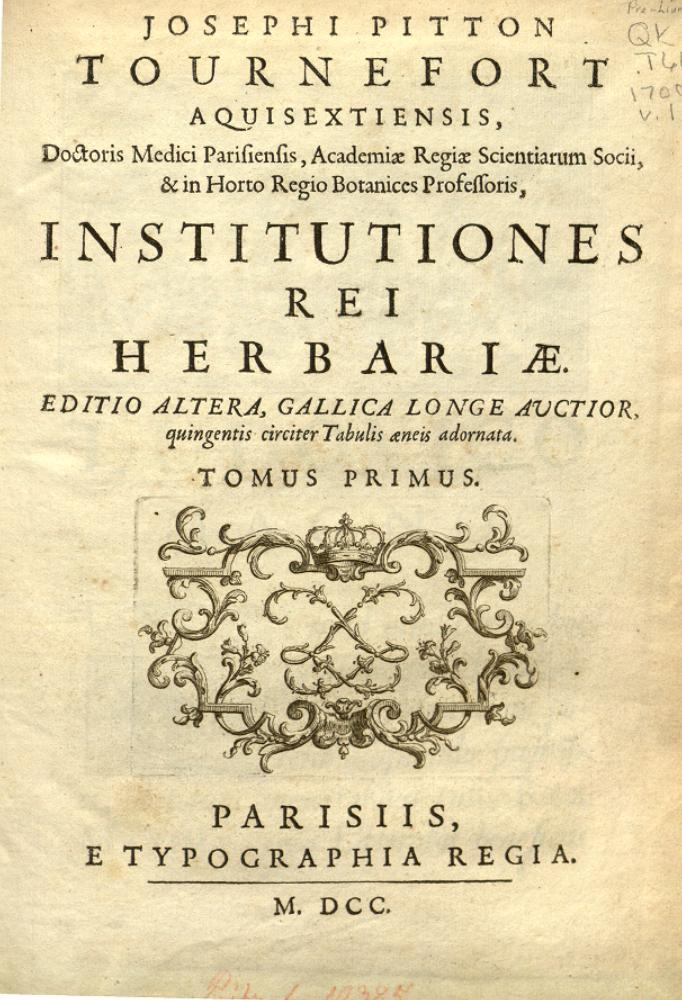
- Author: Joseph Pitton de Tournefort
- Language: Latin
- Genre: Botany
- Publication date: 1700
- Publication place: France
- Preceded by: Elements de Botanique
- Followed by: Botanical institutions

Institutiones rei herbariae (transl. The Instruction of Botany), originally published in French as Eléments de botanique, (Note: The full title was Eléments de botanique, ou Méthode pour reconnaître les Plantes (transl. Elements of the Botanical, or Methods for the Identification of Plants)) is a 1700 Latin-language botanical compendium. The book was the principal work of Joseph Pitton de Tournefort, a French botanist credited with establishing the modern concept of the genus.

== Contents ==
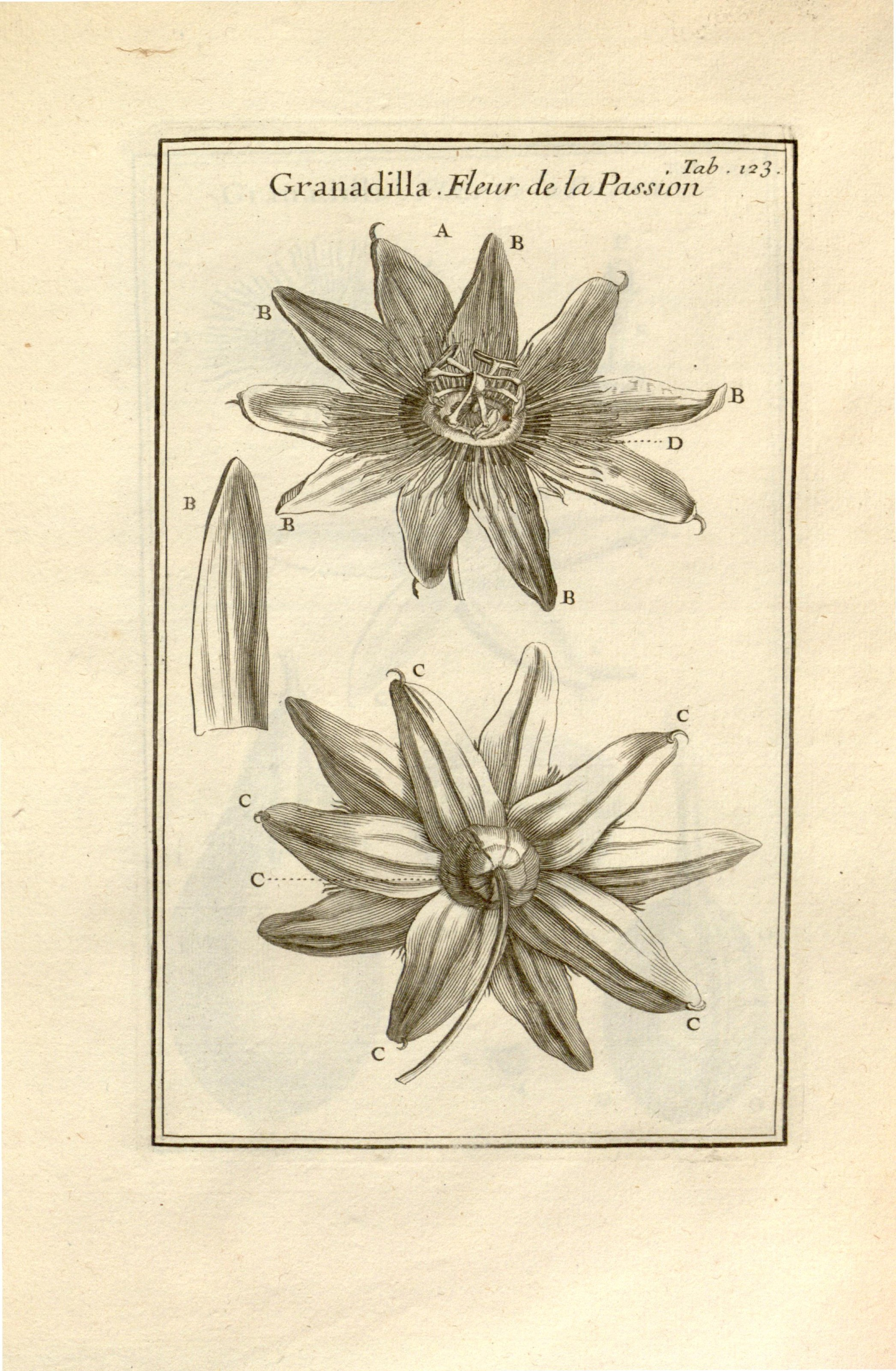
Images of Fleur de la Passion, or flowers of Granadilla plants in the genus Passiflora

As a part of the book's introduction, Tournefort included what may be the first recorded history of botany, titled Isagoge in rem herbarium. In it, some of the most important botanical authors are noted, and brief biographies are given for each. In the 1694 edition Eléments de botanique, Tournefort argued against John Ray's conception of the genus, to which Ray responded twice in 1696. However, in Institutiones rei herbariae in 1700, criticisms towards Ray were removed and replaced with praise.

The main portion of the book contains an exhaustive list of plant names, organized in a system of "classes", "sections", "genera", and "species". Furthermore, myriad images of plant leaves and flowers are included throughout the volume, engraved on copper-plate.

== Publication ==
While Institutiones rei herbariae was published in 1700 (and again in 1719), the book was originally written in French in 1694 as Eléments de botanique. Beginning in 1716, an English language version of Institutiones was published monthly under the title Botanical institutions. (Note: The full title was Botanical institutions of Mr. Tournefort, chief botanist to the late French king) Rather than being translated from the original French work, Botanical institutions was adapted from the Latin Institutiones rei herbariae. The edition included a direct translation of the original, additional commentary from English contributors, two alphabetical indices, and a brief biography on Tournefort.

== Legacy ==
Tournefort's central work has been praised for its simplicity of organization, and for its role as a foundational document for later botanists. One biographer of Tournefort noted that the work was highly influenced by the societal thinking of the time. Eléments de botanique was a strictly utilitarian work: it was solely designed to facilitate plant identification in order that those plants may be put to use for their various purposes. As such, every name had to be clearly linked to one species only; there was as little ambiguity as possible. Many French, English, Italian, and German botanists continued to use Tournefort's system throughout the first half of the 18th century, much in the same way that later taxonomists would model their works off the system of Carl Linnaeus.

The book also reached outside of botanical circles. For example, Charles De Geer (who would later become a prominent entomologist) purchased three volumes of the 1719 edition of Institutiones rei herbariae. De Geer used the book to identify plants in his own garden, and also made use of Tournefort's classification system in his publications.

However, some 18th-century naturalists, following the principles of John Locke, argued against the nominalism of Tournefort. Where Tournefort argued that the "essence of the plant" could be tied to specific and generic names, botanists like Georges-Louis Leclerc and Jean-Baptiste Lamarck did not believe an organized science should be burdened by arbitrary nominal distinctions.
