= Heladena multiflora =

Scientific classification
- Kingdom: Plantae
- Clade: Tracheophytes
- Clade: Angiosperms
- Clade: Eudicots
- Clade: Rosids
- Order: Malpighiales
- Family: Malpighiaceae
- Genus: Heladena
- Species: H. multiflora

Binomial name
- Heladena multiflora (Hook. & Arn.) Nied.

Synonyms
- Bunchosia multiflora Hook. & Arn.; Heladena biglandulosa A.Juss.; Heladena bunchosioides A.Juss.; Heladena albiflora A.Juss., nom. illeg.; Hiraea bunchosioides A.Juss.; Malpigiantha volubilis Rojas Acosta; Mascagnia biglandulosa Griseb.; Mascagnia bunchosioides Griseb.

Species of flowering plant

Heladena multiflora is a species of flowering plant in the family Malpighiaceae. It is a woody vine or sometimes a shrub or small tree native to gallery forests and woodlands of central Brazil, Paraguay, Uruguay, and northeastern Argentina.
