= Heladena echinata =

Scientific classification
- Kingdom: Plantae
- Clade: Tracheophytes
- Clade: Angiosperms
- Clade: Eudicots
- Clade: Rosids
- Order: Malpighiales
- Family: Malpighiaceae
- Genus: Heladena
- Species: H. echinata

Binomial name
- Heladena echinata (Griseb.) R.F.Almeida & M.Pell.

Synonyms
- Henlea echinata Griseb.; Henleophytum echinatum (Griseb.) Small; Henleophytum echinatum f. rotundifolium Urb. & Nied.; Henleophytum plumigerum Sauvalle

Species of flowering plant

Heladena echinata (synonym Henleophytum echinatum) is a species of flowering plant in the Malpighiaceae. It is a woody twining vine with bristly fruits native to thickets on limestone in Cuba.
