= De Jussieu system =

Late 18th century system of plant taxonomy

An early system of plant taxonomy developed by Antoine Laurent de Jussieu (1748–1836), the de Jussieu System (1789), is of great importance as a starting point for botanical nomenclature at the rank of family, together with Michel Adanson's Familles naturelles des plantes (1763). While Adanson introduced the concept of families, Jussieu arranged them hierarchically into Divisions, Classes and Orders (equivalent to families), in his seminal Genera plantarum.

After the publication of Genera plantarum Jussieu published many memoirs further developing the description and circumscription of families. His final system was published posthumously in 1837, a year after his death.

== Organization ==
- Index: Structured p. lxiii, Alphabetical p. 454
- Overview: Page lxii - Classes and orders

The main groups recognized are:

- I. Acotyledones
- II. Monocotyledones
- III. Dicotyledones

Further subdivided by the position of the stamens and calyx in reference to the ovary

  - Hypogyna (“below ovary”; Ovary above attachment of floral parts)
  - Perigyna (Ovary surrounded by attachment of floral parts)
  - Epigyna (“above ovary”; Ovary below attachment of floral parts)

== Acotyledones ==
- I. Acotyledones (page 1)
  Classes: 1, with as families: Fungi, Algae, Hepaticae, Musci, Filices, Najades

== Monocotyledones ==
- II. Monocotyledones (page 21)
  Classes: 2-4

2: Stamina hypogyna (page 23)

4 Orders
4. Ordo I Aroideae (pages 23–25)

...

7. Ordo IV Gramineae (pages 28–35)

3: Stamina perigyna (page 35)

8 Orders
11. Ordo I Palmae (page 37-40)
12. Ordo II Asparagi (pages 40-43)
13. Ordo III Junci (pages 43 - 48)
14. Ordo IV Lilia (pages 48-9)
15. Ordo V Bromeliae (pages 49-51)
16. Ordo VI Asphodeli (pages 51-53)
17. Ordo VII Narcissi (pages 54-56)
18. Ordo VIII Irides (pages 57-60)

4: Stamina epigyna (page 60)

3 Orders
19. Ordo I Musae (pages 61-62)
21. Ordo III Hydrocharides (pages 67-69)

== Dicotyledones ==
- III. Dicotyledones (page 70)
  A. Monoclinae
  a) Apetalae (Absent petals)
  Classes: 5-7

5: Stamina epigyna (page 72)
6: Stamina perigyna (page 72)
7: Stamina hypogyna (page 86)

- b) Monopetalae (Fused petals)
  Classes: 8-11

8: Corolla hypogyna (page 93) 15 orders

1. Lysimachiae
...
15. Sapotae

9: Corolla perigyna (page 153)
10: Corolla epigyna: antheris connatis (page 166)
11: Corolla epigyna: antheris distinctis (page 193)

- c) Polypetalae (Free and separate petals)
  Classes: 12-14

12: Stamina epigyna (page 216)
13: Stamina hypogyna (page 228)

22 Orders
...
11. Ordo XX Cisti (page 294)
...

14: Stamina perigyna (page 305) 13 orders

- B. Diclinae (page 383)
  Classes: 15

== Bibliography ==
- Jussieu, Antoine Laurent de (1789). Genera plantarum: secundum ordines naturales disposita, juxta methodum in Horto regio parisiensi exaratam, anno M.DCC.LXXIV (in Latin). Paris. OCLC 5161409.(also available at Gallica))
- Jussieu, Antoine (1837). "Introductio in historiam plantarum". Annales des Sciences Naturelles (in Latin): 97–160, 193–239.
- Stevens, Peter Francis (1994). The Development of Biological Systematics: Antoine-Laurent de Jussieu, Nature, and the Natural System. Columbia University Press. ISBN 978-0231515085.
