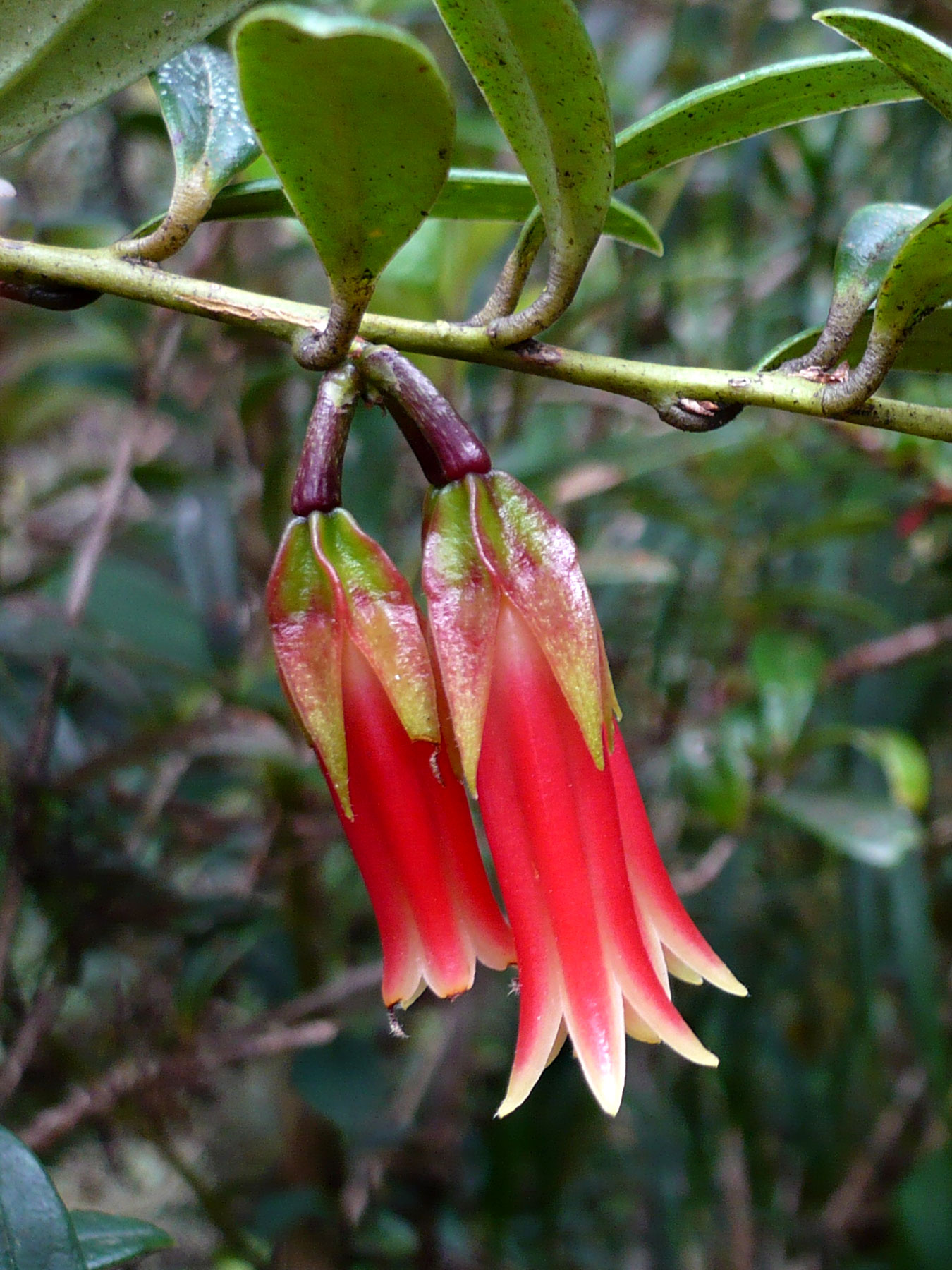

Conservation status
- Vulnerable (IUCN 2.3)

Scientific classification
- Kingdom: Plantae
- Clade: Tracheophytes
- Clade: Angiosperms
- Clade: Eudicots
- Clade: Asterids
- Order: Ericales
- Family: Ericaceae
- Genus: Ceratostema
- Species: C. oellgaardii

Binomial name
- Ceratostema oellgaardii Luteyn 1992

= Ceratostema oellgaardii =

Species of flowering plant

Ceratostema oellgaardii is a shrub species of Ceratostema found in Loja, Ecuador at elevations from 2600 to 3300 meters.
