= Pyšely =

- Town
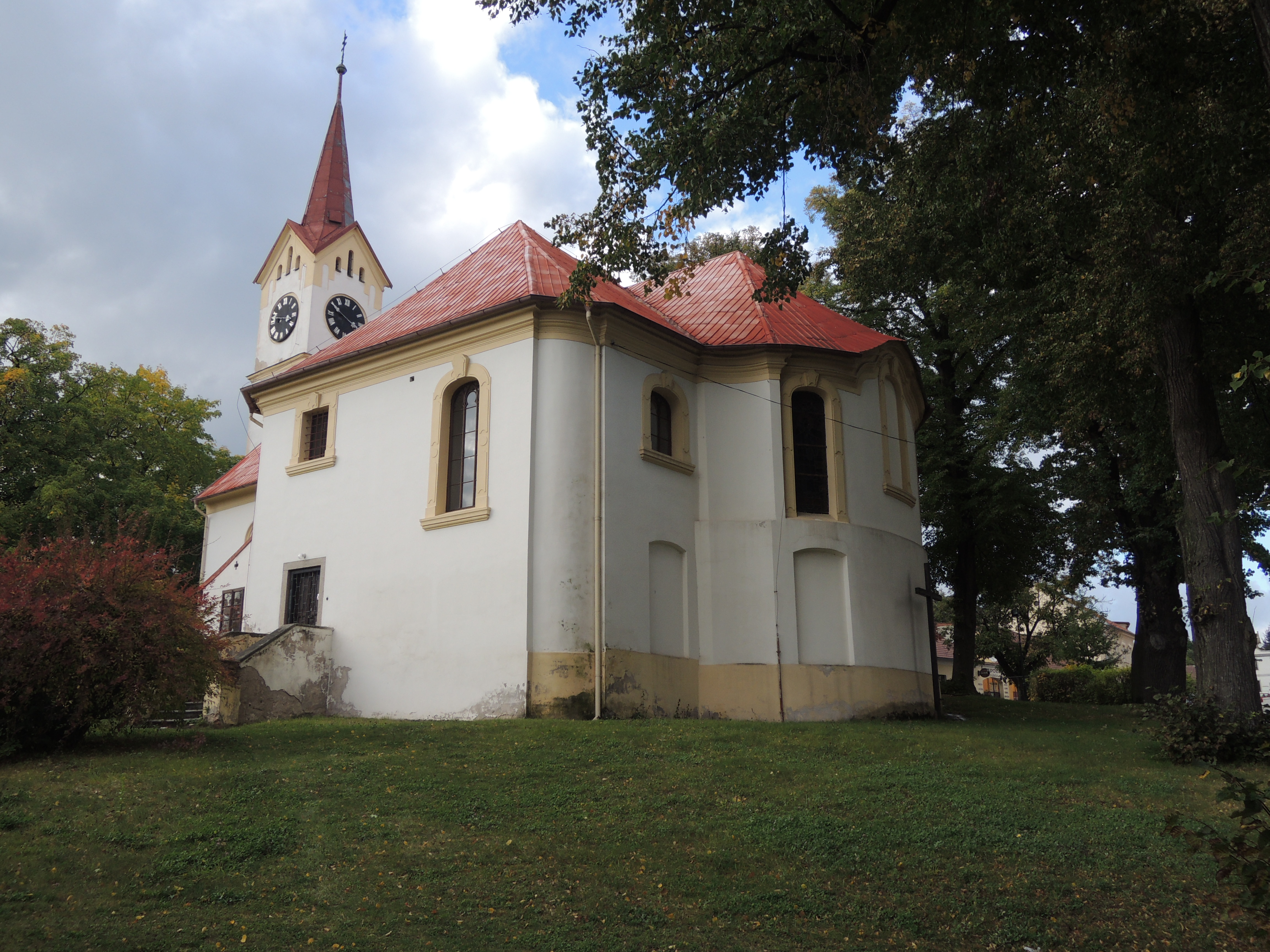
- Church of the Exaltation of the Holy Cross

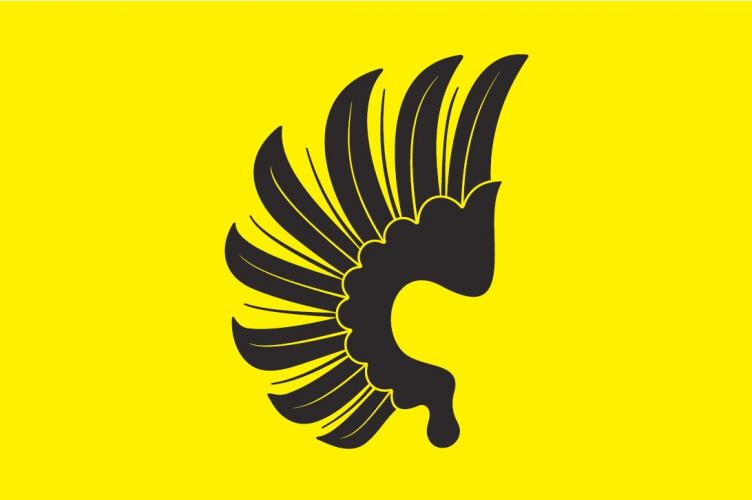
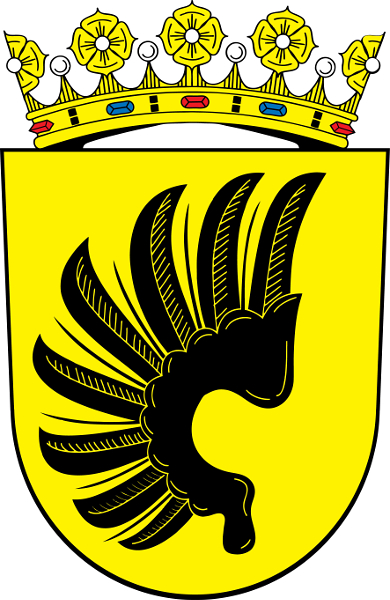
- Flag Coat of arms

- Location in the Czech Republic
- Coordinates: 49°52′30″N 14°40′42″E
- Country: Czech Republic
- Region: Central Bohemian
- District: Benešov
- First mentioned: 1295

Government
  - Mayor: Štěpánka Bednářová

Area
  - Total: 12.81 km^{2} (4.95 sq mi)
- Elevation: 372 m (1,220 ft)

Population (2026-01-01)
  - Total: 2,361
  - Density: 184.3/km^{2} (477.4/sq mi)
- Time zone: UTC+1 (CET)
  - Summer (DST): UTC+2 (CEST)
- Postal codes: 251 67, 257 22
- Website: www.pysely.cz

Pyšely (Czech pronunciation: [ˈpɪʃɛlɪ]) is a town in Benešov District in the Central Bohemian Region of the Czech Republic. It has about 2,400 inhabitants.

== Administrative division ==
Pyšely consists of five municipal parts (in brackets population according to the 2021 census):

- Pyšely (1,623)
- Borová Lhota (106)
- Kovářovice (56)
- Nová Ves (102)
- Zaječice (409)

== Etymology ==
In old Czech, the word pyšel denoted a person with shortness of breath, a person who wheezes. The name Pyšely can be translated as "the village of people who wheeze".

== Geography ==
Pyšely is located about 10 kilometres (6 mi) north of Benešov and 22 km (14 mi) southeast of Prague. It lies in the Benešov Uplands. The highest point is a hill at 478 m (1,568 ft) above sea level.

== History ==
The first written mention of Pyšely is from 1295. The greatest development of Pyšely occurred during the rule of the Halleweil family, which owned it from the 17th century until 1734. The village was promoted to a town by Emperor Leopold I in 1703. After Pyšely ceased to be a town after World War II, its town title was restored in 2007.

== Demographics ==
Historical population

Year	Pop.	±%
1869	1,588	—
1880	1,300	−18.1%
1890	1,218	−6.3%
1900	1,138	−6.6%
1910	1,216	+6.9%

Year	Pop.	±%
1921	1,261	+3.7%
1930	1,458	+15.6%
1950	1,351	−7.3%
1961	1,457	+7.8%
1970	1,275	−12.5%

Year	Pop.	±%
1980	1,280	+0.4%
1991	1,116	−12.8%
2001	1,196	+7.2%
2011	1,744	+45.8%
2021	2,296	+31.7%

Source: Censuses

== Transport ==
There are no railways or major roads passing through the municipal territory. The I/3 road (part of the European route E55), which connects the D1 motorway with Tábor and further continues as the D3 motorway, runs along the southern municipal border.

The train station named Pyšely, which serves the town, is located in Čerčany-Vysoká Lhota. It lies on the railway line Prague–Benešov.

== Sights ==
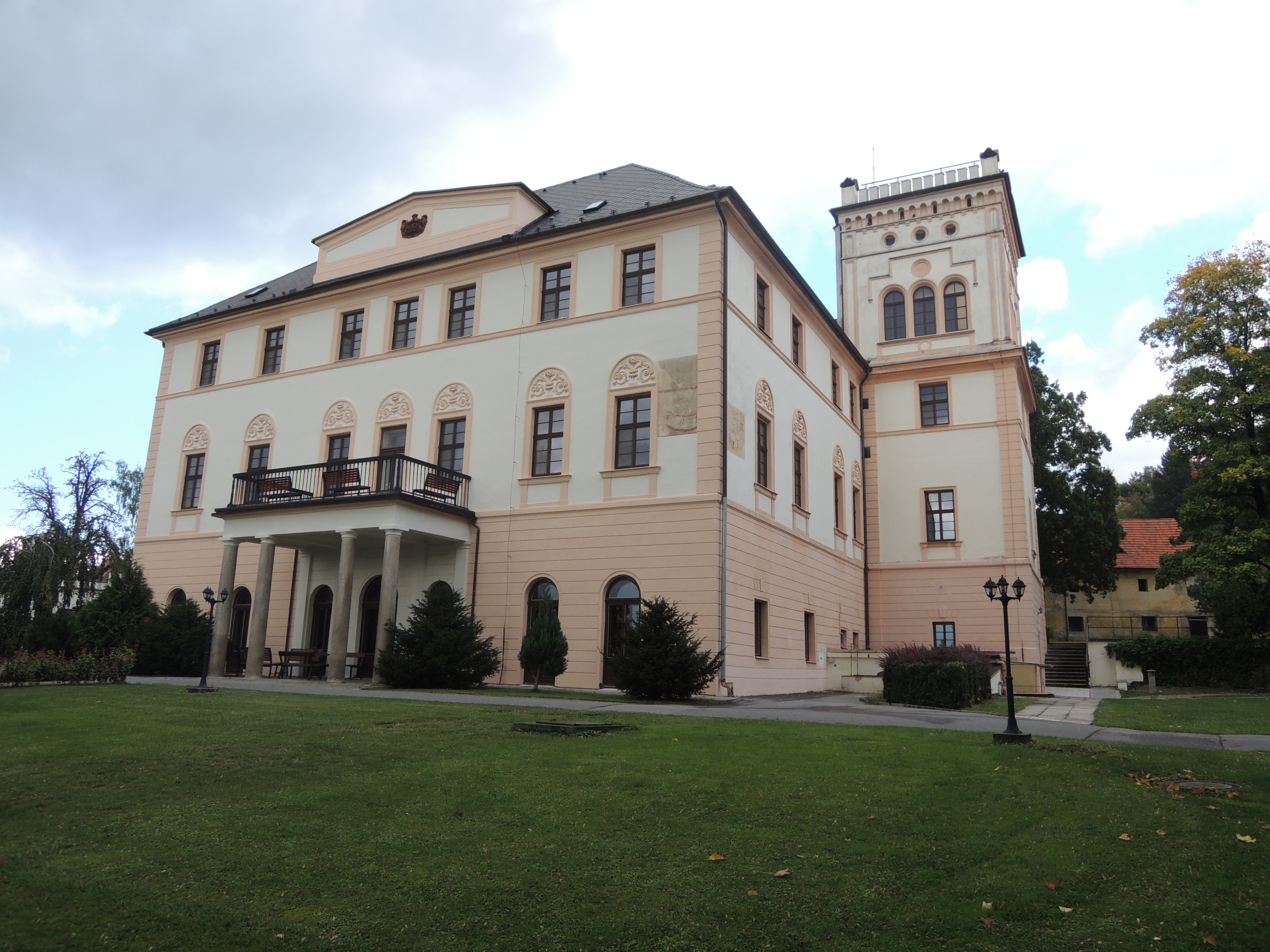
Pyšely Castle

The main landmark of the town is the Pyšely Castle. The castle was first documented in 1587, when it was reconstructed in the Renaissance style. Later it was rebuilt in the Baroque style. The castle was gradually expanded and a castle park was founded. Since 1956, the building has served as a retirement home.

The Church of the Exaltation of the Holy Cross has a Romanesque origin and probably dates from the 12th century. Its present appearance is the result of extensive reconstructions in the years 1781–1783 and 1861–1862. Next to the church is a rectory, built probably in 1763–1765.

On a hill above the town is the Chapel of the Virgin Mary. It was built in the Baroque style in 1699.

== Notable people ==
- Emanuel Rádl (1873–1942), biologist and philosopher
