= Pittoniotis =

Scientific classification
- Kingdom: Plantae
- Clade: Tracheophytes
- Clade: Angiosperms
- Clade: Eudicots
- Clade: Asterids
- Order: Gentianales
- Family: Rubiaceae
- Genus: Pittoniotis; Griseb.

Genus of plants

Pittoniotis is a genus of flowering plants belonging to the family Rubiaceae.

Its native range is from southern Mexico to Venezuela and Ecuador, in South America. It is found in Belize, Colombia, Costa Rica, Ecuador, El Salvador, Guatemala, Honduras, Mexico, Nicaragua, Panamá, south-western Caribbean and Venezuela.

The genus name of Pittoniotis is in honour of Joseph Pitton de Tournefort (1656–1708), a French botanist, notable as the first to make a clear definition of the concept of genus for plants. It was first described and published in Bonplandia (Hannover) Vol.6 on page 8 in 1858.

== Known species ==
According to Kew:

- Pittoniotis protracta (Bartl. ex DC.) Griseb.
- Pittoniotis rotata C.M.Taylor
- Pittoniotis trichantha Griseb.
