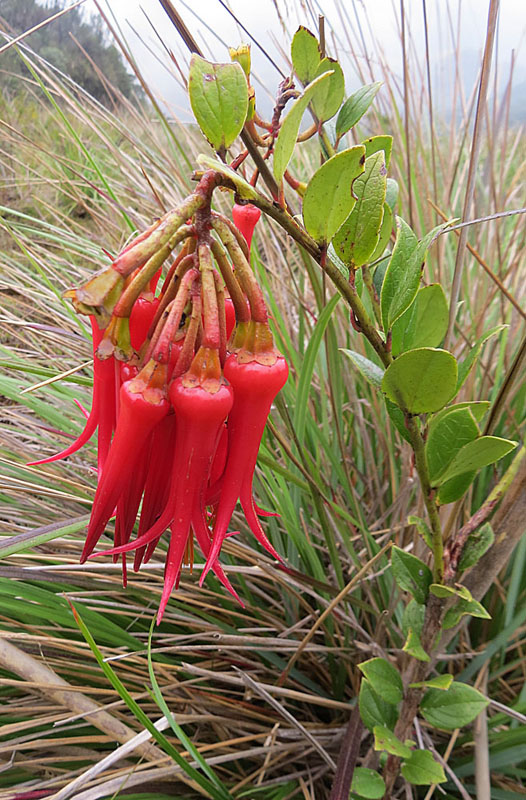

Conservation status
- Least Concern (IUCN 2.3)

Scientific classification
- Kingdom: Plantae
- Clade: Tracheophytes
- Clade: Angiosperms
- Clade: Eudicots
- Clade: Asterids
- Order: Ericales
- Family: Ericaceae
- Genus: Ceratostema
- Species: C. alatum

Binomial name
- Ceratostema alatum (Hoerold) Sleumer 1935

= Ceratostema alatum =

Species of flowering plant

Ceratostema alatum is a species of Ceratostema found in Ecuador.
