= Emanuel Rádl =

Czech biologist, historian of science and philosopher (1873-1942)

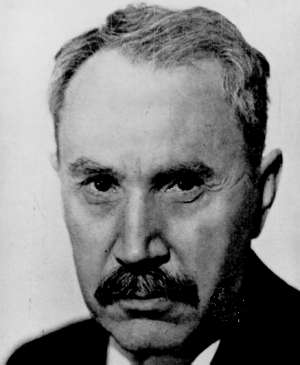
Emanuel Rádl

Emanuel Rádl (21 December 1873 – 12 May 1942) was a Czech biologist, historian of science and philosopher. He was a critical supporter of Masaryk's pre-war democratic Czechoslovakia. He earned international renown by his works on the evolution of neural system and as historian of evolution theories.

== Life and thought ==
One of five children of a village merchant's family in Pyšely (35 km south of Prague), Rádl studied biology at Charles University in Prague, where he became assistant professor in 1904 and full professor in 1919. He worked on the neural system of insects, on phototropism and on the evolution of sight. Influenced by the German biologist and philosopher Hans Driesch, he became interested in philosophy of life and in a large work The History of Biological Theories (in German 1905–1909, in English 1930; reprint in 1988) he criticized the evolutionism of the 19th century. At the book's climax at the end of Chapter 33, Rádl dismisses Darwinism with the words

We may therefore sum up the modern position in Driesch's words: 'For those with insight Darwinism has been dead for a long time'... Darwinism as a tyrannic doctrine, which imperiously enchains the minds of men, is dead.

— Rádl, The History of Biological Theories, 1930. p. 388

Under the influence of Masaryk he inclined more and more towards philosophical questions, became a critic of scientific positivism and after the establishment of Czechoslovakia (1918) a public critic of several contemporary tendencies he considered dangerous. He wrote books on Czech and German nationalism, on social justice, on the fundamental differences between the West and the East and very early against the misuse of racial theories and against antisemitism. Together with the Protestant theologian J. L. Hromádka he co-founded the Czech Academic YMCA and published numerous booklets on various public topics. In 1934 he presided the 8th International Congress of Philosophy in Prague, but after 1935 he was gradually excluded from public life by a serious illness. He died in 1942 in Prague during the German occupation in almost complete isolation. His posthumous book Consolation from Philosophy, in the oppressive mood of war, is a highly personal profession of faith in the lasting values of truth and religion and evoked a lively discussion after its publication in 1946.

"How to save our civilization from decay? This is the desperate question of our time, the more desperate that no one feels the danger."

== List of selected publications ==
In English:

- Geschichte der biologischen Theorien in der Neuzeit, 2nd ed., 1913 ii vols. (Leipzig, 1905–9), trans. as The History of Biological Theories. (1930) at Internet Archive ISBN 978-0-7812-0068-4
  - i Seit dem Ende des siebzehnten Jahrhunderts (1905)
  - ii Geschichte der Entwicklungstheorien in der Biologie des XIX. Jahrhunderts (1909)

In Czech and German:

- New observations on the phototropism of animals [Nová pozorování o fototropismu zvířat] (in Czech 1902, in German 1903)
- The history of evolutionary theories [Dějiny vývojových teorií v biologii 19. století] (In German 1905 a 1909, 2nd ed. 1913; in Czech 1909 and 2006)
- A new treaty on the central nerve system [Nová nauka o ústředním nervstvu] (in Czech 1911, in German 1912)
- The romantic science [Romantická věda] (1918)
- The West and the East. Reflections from a journey [Západ a Východ. Filosofické úvahy z cest] (1925)
- The modern science. Its substance, methods, results [Moderní věda. Její podstata, methody, výsledky] (1926)
- The war between Czechs and Germans [Válka Čechů s Němci] (1928)
- A history of philosophy [Dějiny filosofie] (1932)
- On the German revolution [O německé revoluci] (1933)
- Consolation from philosophy [Útěcha z filosofie] (1946)

== Bibliography ==
- Sarton, George (June 1914). "Geschichte der biologischen Theorien in der Neuzeit . Radl, Em". Isis. 2 (1): 224–229. doi:10.1086/357847.
- Hermann – Markoš (eds.), Emanuel Rádl, vědec a filosof. Praha 2004. ISBN 80-7298-107-2 (in Czech)
- J. L. Hromádka, Don Quijote české filosofie. Praha 1947. ISBN 80-86263-66-5 (in Czech)
- Jan Patočka, Věčnost a dějinnost. Rádlův poměr k pojetím člověka. Prague 2007. ISBN 978-80-7298-256-1 (in Czech)
