= Louis-Guillaume Le Monnier =

French botanist (1717–1799)

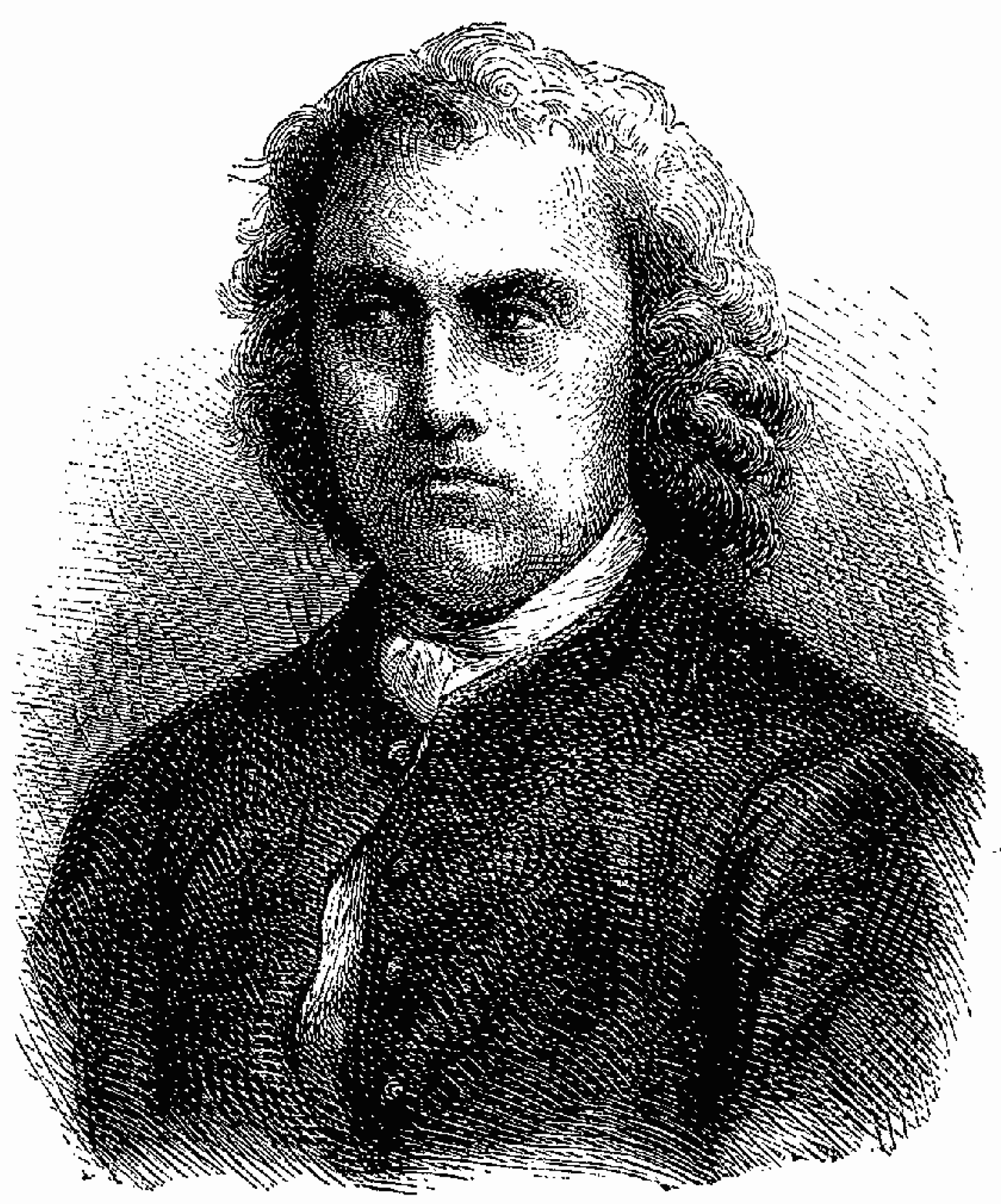
- Born: 27 June 1717; Paris
- Died: 7 September 1799 (aged 82); Versailles
- Occupation: Natural scientist

Louis-Guillaume Le Monnier (sometimes written as Lemonnier) (27 June 1717 – 7 September 1799) was a French natural scientist and contributor to the Encyclopédie ou Dictionnaire raisonné des sciences, des arts et des métiers.

He was born near Vire as the son of Pierre Le Monnier (1675–1757), who was a scientist himself and a member of the French Academy of Sciences. Louis-Guillaume's older brother was the astronomer Pierre Charles Le Monnier.

Louis-Guillaume Le Monnier worked in physics, geology, medicine, and botany. In 1739 he accompanied the expedition of César-François Cassini de Thury and Nicolas Louis de Lacaille to extend the Meridian of Paris and documented mines and the geology and botany along the route. In the same year, he also began working at the hospital of Saint Germain en Laye as a physician. He researched electrical phenomena, sending a current from a Leyden jar through a wire 950 toises (about 1,850 m) long and concluded that electricity propagated "instantaneously" in the wire. Later research of his on electrical phenomena was concerned with thunderstorms and the "fair weather condition".

Like his father and his brother before him, Louis-Guillaume became a member of the Académie des sciences on 3 July 1743, and was elected a fellow of the Royal Society on 7 February 1745, of which his brother also was a member. On 30 June 1746, one year after his brother, he also became a member of the Prussian Academy of Sciences.

With Claude Richard he was one of the original organizers of Louis XV's botanic collection at Petit Trianon, an undertaking quickly joined by Bernard de Jussieu. Lemonnier was appointed professor of botany at the Jardin du Roi (later the Jardin des Plantes) in 1759, filling a spot left by the death of Bernard de Jussieu's brother Antoine in April of the previous year. In 1786 he was succeeded as professor of botany by René Louiche Desfontaines.

For Diderot's Encyclopédie he wrote several entries, among them "Electricité", "Magnétisme", "Aimant" (Magnet), and "Aiguille aimantée" (Compass needle). After 1759, he stopped publishing, though. In his later career, he became in 1770 "Premier médecin ordinaire" and in 1788 "Premier médecin du Roi".

His lover was Marie Louise de Rohan, Madame de Marsan, future Governess of the Children of France.

His publications include:

- Leçons de physique expérimentale, sur l'équilibre des liqueurs et sur la nature et les propriétés de l'air (1742).
- Observations d'histoire naturelle faites dans les provinces méridionales de France, pendant l'année 1739 (1744).
- Recherches sur la Communication de l'Electricité (1746).
- Observations sur l'Electricité de l'Air (1752).
