= Roger Hahn =

American historian of science (1932–2011)

- Born: January 5, 1932; Paris, France
- Died: May 30, 2011 (aged 79); New York City, New York, US
- Occupation: Historian of science
- Awards: Officier de l’Ordre des Palmes Académiques (1977)

Academic background
- Education: Harvard University (BA 1953; MAT 1954); École Pratique des Hautes Études (diploma 1955); Cornell University (PhD 1962)
- Doctoral advisor: Henry Guerlac

Academic work
- Discipline: Historian of science
- Sub-discipline: 18th-century French science
- Institutions: University of California, Berkeley (1961–)
- Notable works: The Anatomy of a Scientific Institution: The Paris Academy of Sciences, 1666–1803 (1971); Pierre Simon Laplace, 1749–1827: A Determined Scientist (2005)

Roger Hahn (January 5, 1932 – May 30, 2011) was an American historian of science known for his work on the scientific culture of 18th-century France and the institutional history of science. A professor at the University of California, Berkeley from 1961 to his retirement emeritus, he was best known for his studies of the Paris Academy of Sciences and of the life and work of Pierre-Simon Laplace.

== Early life and education ==
Roger Hahn was born in Paris, France, on January 5, 1932, into a Jewish family that fled Nazi oppression in 1941 when he was 9 years old by escaping to New York City. He pursued higher education at Harvard University, graduating in 1953 with a Bachelor of Arts degree in both physics and history; at Harvard, he studied with I. Bernard Cohen and Thomas Kuhn. He remained at Harvard to earn a Master of Arts in Teaching (M.A.T.) in education in 1954.

As a Fulbright Scholar, Hahn earned a diploma at the École Pratique des Hautes Études in Paris 1954–1955, where he attended seminars by historians of science Alexandre Koyré and René Taton. He then served in the U.S. Army as an interpreter stationed near Paris at the Supreme Headquarters Allied Powers Europe 1955–1957, then earned his Ph.D. in the history of science from Cornell University in 1962; at Cornell, he was supervised by Henry Guerlac.

== Career ==
Hahn joined the Department of History at the University of California, Berkeley, in 1961, where he remained for his entire academic career. With John L. Heilbron, he played a key role in developing the history of science as a discipline at the university. Hahn served as the director of Berkeley's Office for the History of Science and Technology (OHST) from 1993 to 1998, and he helped expand the program's library collections, for instance acquiring important manuscripts related to the history of science.

His research focused on the scientific institutions and figures of 18th-century France. His most influential work, The Anatomy of a Scientific Institution: The Paris Academy of Sciences, 1666–1803 (1971), was considered an important study in the social history of science. His biography of Pierre-Simon Laplace, Pierre Simon Laplace, 1749–1827: A Determined Scientist (2005), became the definitive English-language work on the renowned French mathematician and astronomer. He also edited and collected Laplace's correspondence with other scientists, which was published after his death.

Hahn received honors including being named an Officier de l’Ordre des Palmes Académiques by the French government in 1977 for his contributions to French culture and academic exchange. He was a fellow of the American Association for the Advancement of Science and a member of the International Academy of the History of Science (IAHS), serving as the IAHS vice president in 2005. He was also a fellow of the American Association for the Advancement of Science and of the American Council of Learned Societies.

== Personal life ==
Hahn was married to Ellen Isabel Leibovici, a musician, on September 11, 1955. They had two daughters, Elisabeth and Sophie, and three grandchildren. Hahn died unexpectedly on May 30, 2011, in New York City, while en route to Paris.
