= Antoine de Jussieu =

French botanist (1686–1758)

- Born: 6 July 1686; Lyon, Lyonnais, Kingdom of France
- Died: 22 April 1758 (aged 71)
- Scientific career
- Fields: Botany, Natural history, Medicine
- Author abbrev. (botany): Ant.Juss.

Antoine de Jussieu (6 July 1686 – 22 April 1758) was a French naturalist, botanist, and physician. The standard author abbreviation Ant.Juss. is used to indicate this person as the author when citing a botanical name.

Jussieu was born in Lyon. He was the son of Christophe de Jussieu (or Dejussieu), an apothecary of some repute, who published a Nouveau traité de la theriaque (1708). Antoine studied at the University of Montpellier, and travelled with his brother Bernard through Spain, Portugal, and southern France. He went to Paris in 1708. Joseph Pitton de Tournefort, whom he succeeded at the Jardin du Roi, later the Jardin des Plantes, died in that year.

His own original publications are not of marked importance, but he edited an edition of Tournefort's Institutions rei herbariae (3 vols., 1719), and a posthumously published work of Jacques Barrelier, Plantae per Galliam, Hispaniam, et Italiam observatae, &c. (1714).

He practiced medicine, chiefly devoting himself to the very poor. His teaching was the subject of a posthumous publication, in 1772, entitled Traité des vertus des plantes.

His brother Bernard de Jussieu is better known.
