= Bernard de Jussieu =

French botanist (1699–1777)

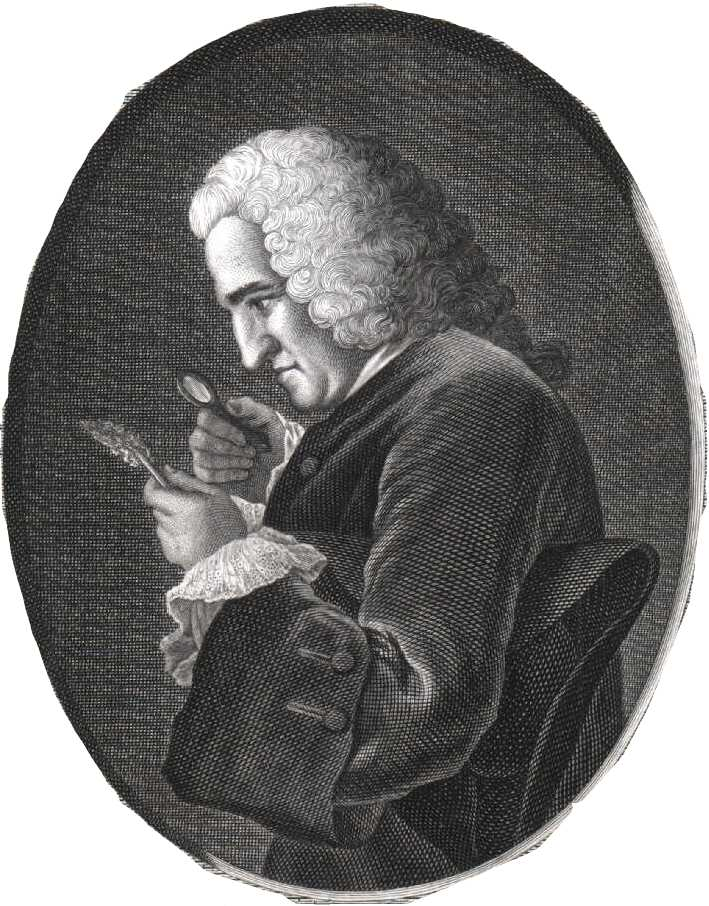
- Born: 17 August 1699; Lyon, Kingdom of France
- Died: 6 November 1777 (aged 78)
- Scientific career
- Fields: Natural History

Signature
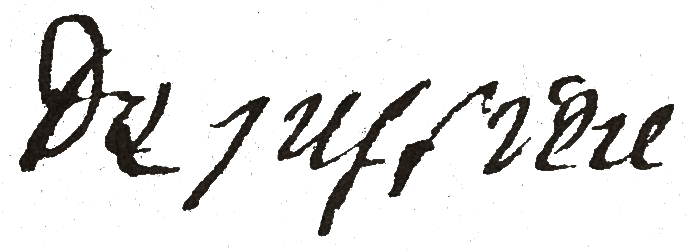

Bernard de Jussieu (French pronunciation: [bɛʁnaʁ də ʒysjø]; 17 August 1699 – 6 November 1777) was a French naturalist, younger brother of Antoine de Jussieu.

Bernard de Jussieu was born in Lyon. He took a medical degree at Montpellier and began practice in 1720, but finding the work uncongenial he gladly accepted his brother's invitation to Paris in 1722, when he succeeded Sébastien Vaillant (1669–1722) as sub-demonstrator of plants in the Jardin des Plantes. In 1725, he brought out a new edition of Joseph Pitton de Tournefort's Histoire des plantes qui naissent aux environs de Paris, 2 vols., which was afterwards translated into English by John Martyn, the original work being incomplete. In the same year he was admitted into the French Academy of Sciences, and communicated several papers to that body.

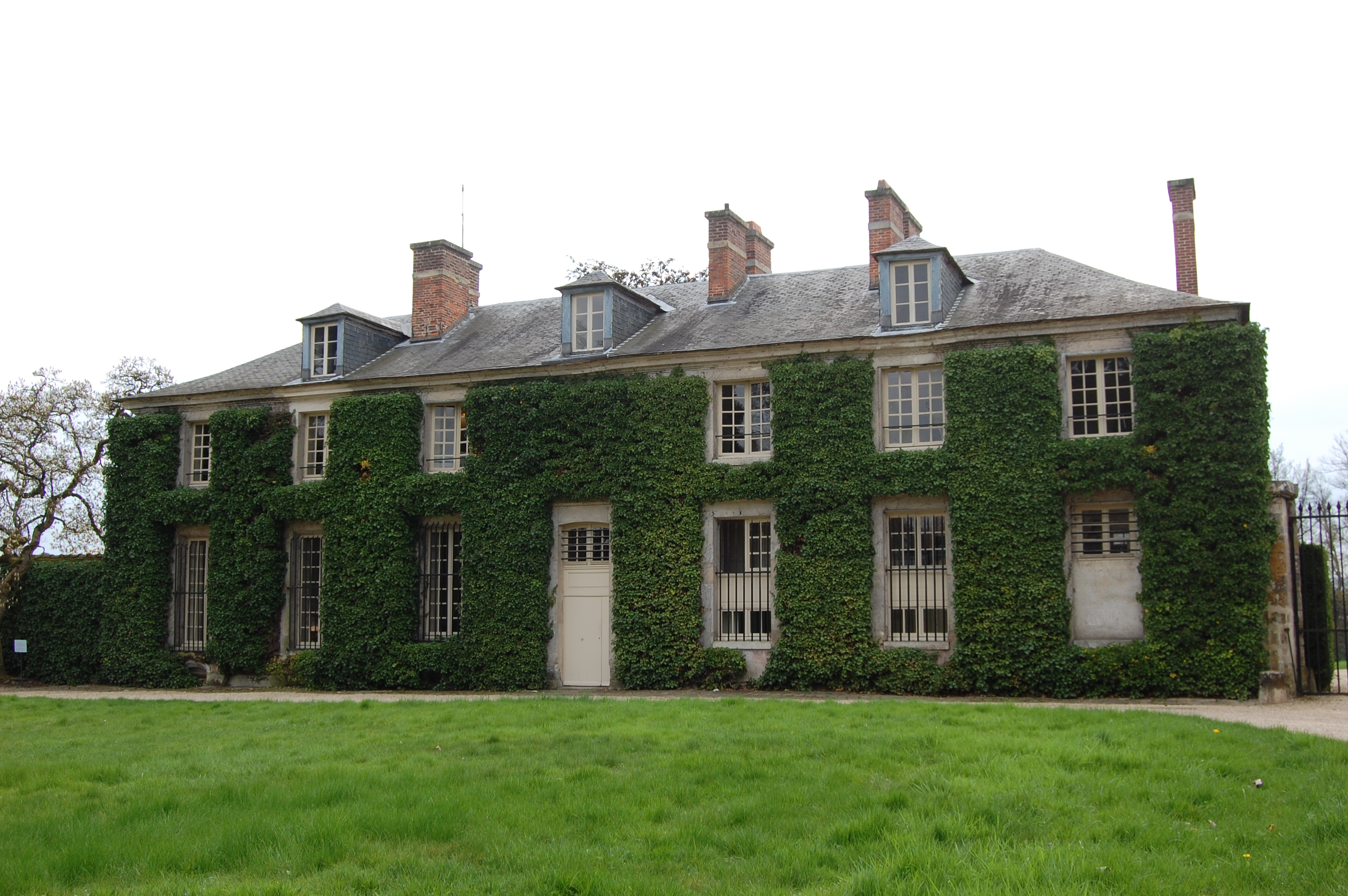
The "Pavillon de Jussieu" near Grand Trianon, now occupied by the Palace of Versailles Research Centre, was not de Jussieu's house, but was probably his residence when he was hosted by Claude and Antoine Richard, the gardeners in chief.

Long before Abraham Trembley (1700–1784) published his Histoire des polypes d'eau douce, Jussieu maintained the doctrine that these organisms were in fact animals, and not the flowers of marine plants, which was the notion at the time; to confirm his views, he made three journeys to the coast of Normandy. Singularly modest and retiring, he published very little, but in 1759 he arranged the plants in the royal garden of the Grand Trianon in the Palace of Versailles, according to his own scheme of classification. This arrangement is printed in his nephew Antoine Laurent de Jussieu's Genera plantarum, and formed the basis of that work. He cared little for the credit of enunciating new discoveries, so long as the facts were made public. On the death of his brother Antoine, he could not be induced to succeed him as professor of botany at the Jardin des Plantes, but prevailed upon L. G. Lemonnier to assume the higher position.

He was elected a foreign member of the Royal Swedish Academy of Sciences in 1749.

The standard botanical author abbreviation B.Juss. is applied to plants described by de Jussieu.
