= Adrien-Henri de Jussieu =

French botanist

Adrien-Henry de Jussieu
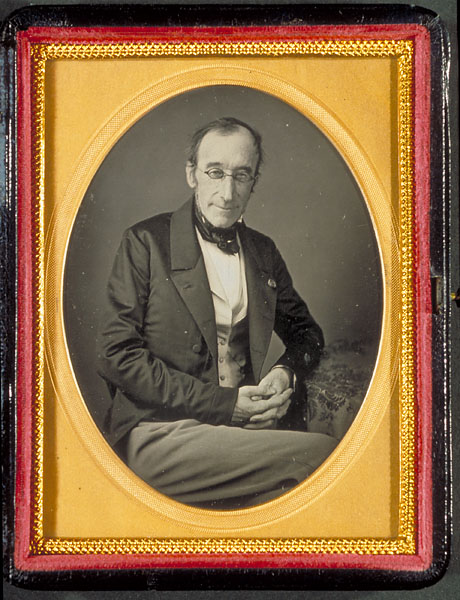
- de Jussieu in 1851.
- Born: 23 December 1797; Paris, France
- Died: 29 June 1853 (aged 55)
- Known for: Cours élémentaire de botanique and Géographie botanique
- Father: Antoine Laurent de Jussieu
- Scientific career
- Fields: Botany
- Workplaces: Jardin des Plantes, Paris
- Author abbrev. (botany): A.Juss.

Adrien-Henri de Jussieu (23 December 1797 – 29 June 1853) was a French botanist.

Born in Paris as the son of botanist Antoine Laurent de Jussieu, he received the degree of Doctor of Medicine in 1824 with a treatise on the plant family Euphorbiaceae. When his father retired in 1826, he succeeded him at the Jardin des Plantes; In 1845 he became professor of organography of plants. He was also president of the French Academy of Sciences. De Jussieu was elected a Foreign Honorary Member of the American Academy of Arts and Sciences in 1850.

His main publications were the Cours élémentaire de botanique (Paris) and the Géographie botanique (Paris, 1846), as well as several monographs, most notably the one on the family Malpighiaceae. In botanical references, he is usually abbreviated as Adr. Juss., also sometimes as A. Juss., as his father already has the abbreviation Juss.

The asteroid 9470 Jussieu was named in honor of the de Jussieu family.

In 1825, the French botanist Charles Gaudichaud-Beaupré published Adriana, a genus of Australian shrubs in the family Euphorbiaceae named in honour of Jussieu.
