= François Cureau de La Chambre =

French physician

François Cureau de La Chambre (19 July 1630 in Le Mans - 22 March 1680 in Versailles) was a French physician during the reign of Louis XIV.

== Biography ==
François was the eldest son of Marin Cureau de la Chambre (1594-1669). He obtained his medical degree at the University of Paris on 3 August 1656.

He was physician of Chancellor Pierre Séguier and his family. He accompanied Armand de Camboust, duc de Coislin and the Abbé de Coislin on the court's trip to the Midi in 1659 and 1660.

In 1660 he was appointed physician to Queen Maria Theresa and the children of France.

In 1665, he was ordinary physician to King Louis XIV, then on 31 July 1671, after the death of his father, who held this position, and on Antoine Vallot's presentation, the King appointed him as a demonstrator operator of the interior of plants (Note: "Démonstrateur opérateur pour l’intérieur des plantes": the composition of the medicines was associated with the "interior of the plants".) of the Botanical Garden (Jardin des Plantes) with a salary of 1500 livres a year. He thus became professor of anatomy and surgery but delegated anatomy to Pierre Cressé and surgery to Pierre Dionis.

François Cureau de La Chambre was ordinary doctor of the Bâtiments du Roi "to take care of all the officers servants and employees of the State" and doctor "to serve with the Admiral of France".

He died at the court of Versailles on 22 March 1680 and was buried at Saint-Eustache.
