= Sébastien Vaillant =

French mycologist (1669-1722)

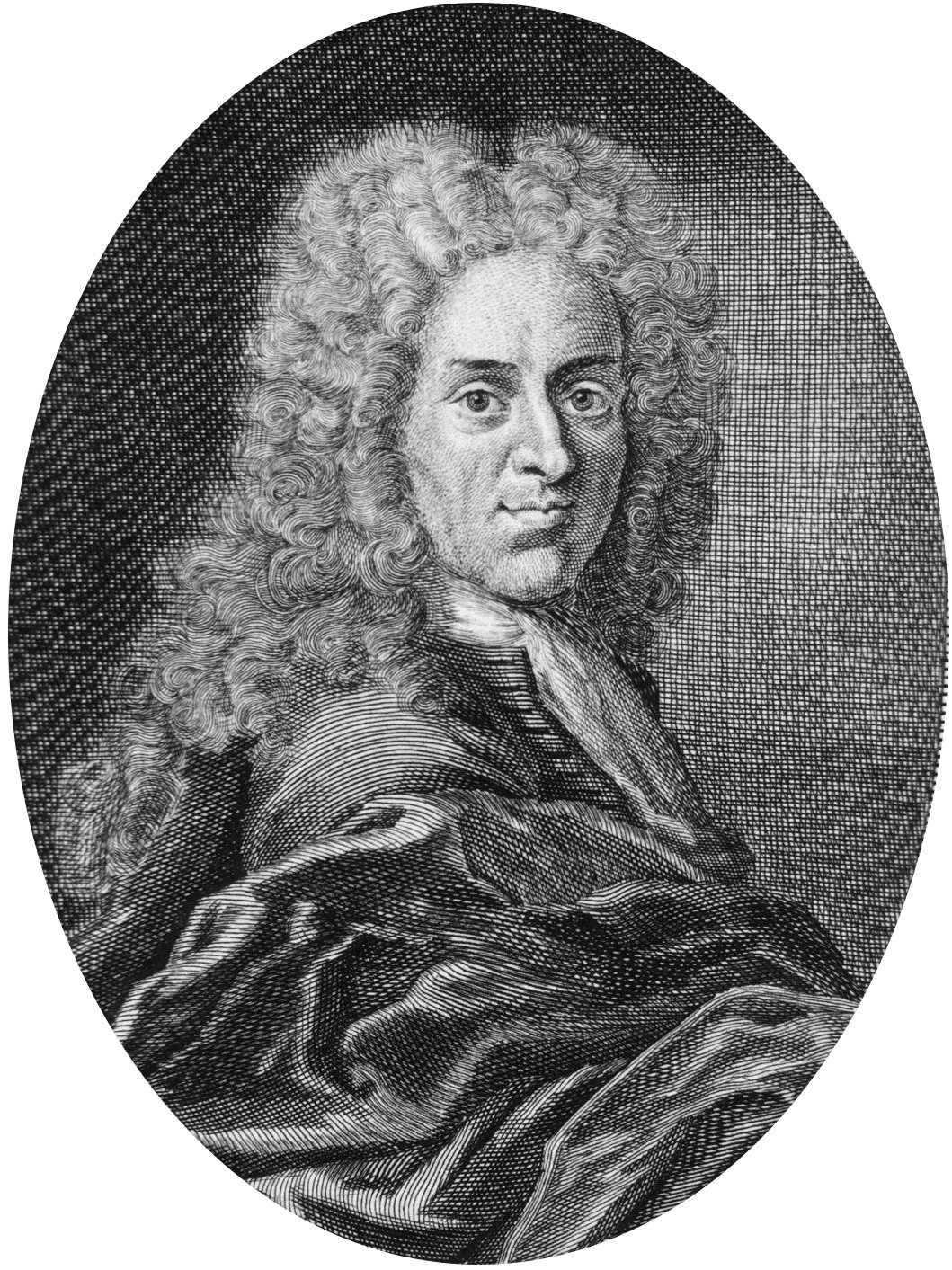
- Born: 26 May 1669; Vigny, Val-d'Oise
- Died: 20 May 1722 (aged 52); Paris
- Education: Jardin des Plantes
- Scientific career
- Fields: Botany
- Academic advisors: Joseph Pitton de Tournefort, Joseph-Guichard Du Verney, Antoine de Saint-Yon
- Author abbrev. (botany): Vaill.

infbx

Sébastien Vaillant (French pronunciation: [sebastjɛ̃ vajɑ̃]; May 26, 1669 – May 20, 1722) was a French botanist who was born at Vigny in present-day Val d'Oise.

== Early years ==
Vaillant went to school at the age of four and by the age of five, he was collecting plants and transplanting them into his father's garden. At the age of six, he was sent to a boarding school at Pontoise. He suffered with a fever for four months which he claims to have cured using lettuce seasoned with vinegar.

He was sent to study with the organist of the Pontoise Cathedral. When the organist died, Vaillant succeeded him at the age of eleven.

Vaillant studied medicine and surgery at the hospital in Pontoise (medicine then included studies in botany). He left Pontoise for Évreux at the age of nineteen. He was at the battle of Fleurus in 1690 as a surgeon. While still a surgeon in 1691, he was in Paris when he took as his master of botany Joseph Pitton de Tournefort (1656–1708). Tournefort used Vaillant's talents while writing Histoire des plantes qui naissent aux environs de Paris (History of the plants that are born around Paris), published in 1698. Vaillant also took lessons in anatomy with Joseph-Guichard Du Verney and chemistry with Antoine de Saint-Yon.

== Botanist ==
Guy-Crescent Fagon, the king's physician and botanist, noticed Sébastien Vaillant and made him his secretary. Vaillant was therefore able to devote himself to the study of plants for which he obtained unlimited access to the Royal Garden. Fagon appointed him director. Fagon himself was a teacher and sub-demonstrator at the Royal Garden.

The garden collections grew considerably under the leadership of Vaillant. Even though Vaillant himself was based in Paris and is remembered for his work on the Parisian flora, the garden had several contributors outside Paris, in particular in the colonies.

Fagon obtained from Louis XIV an authorisation to build a "Cabinet of drugs" in the Royal Garden and charged Vaillant to furnish it and to provide security.

Charles Bouvard had the first greenhouse built: the Garden had plants from hot countries, and in 1714 Vaillant obtained the authorization to build another one.

He became ill and too poor to publish his Botanicon parisiensis (alphabetically or Enumeration of plants that grow in and around Paris) illustrated by Claude Aubriet. A fruit of 36 years of work, he left his work at Herman Boerhaave's home, Oud Poelgeest. The work contained engraved illustrations and was published in 1727. It is a work of particular importance in the history of botany and one of the first to describe the flora known. Vaillant introduced the terms of stamen, ovary, and egg in their current direction.

All his life, Vaillant opposed the theses of Joseph Pitton de Tournefort. As a mark of respect Carl von Linné named a genus Valantia after Vaillant in the Rubiaceae.

His herbarium is now kept at the National Museum of Natural History, France.
