= Guy-Crescent Fagon =

French physician and botanist

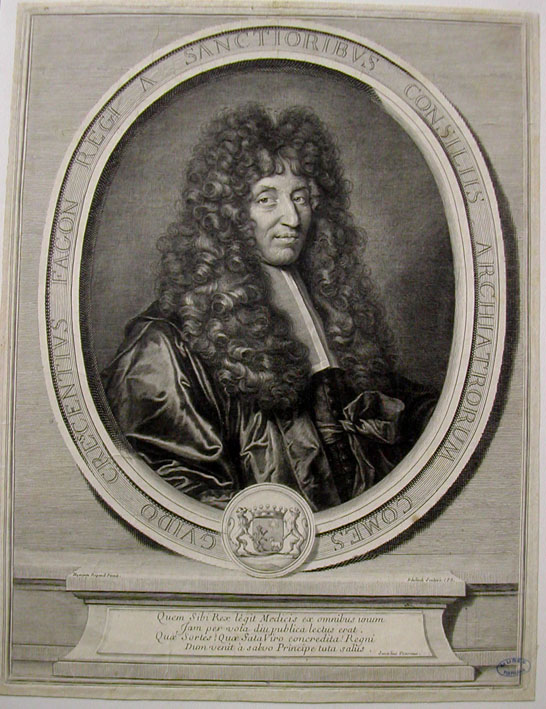
- Born: May 11, 1638; Paris
- Died: March 11, 1718 (aged 79); Paris

Guy-Crescent Fagon (11 May 1638 – 11 March 1718) was a French physician and botanist. He came from nobility and his uncle, Guy de La Brosse, had founded the Royal Gardens. Fagon was director of the gardens too. His substitute professors were Gilles-François Boulduc, Antoine de Saint-Yon and Étienne François Geoffroy.

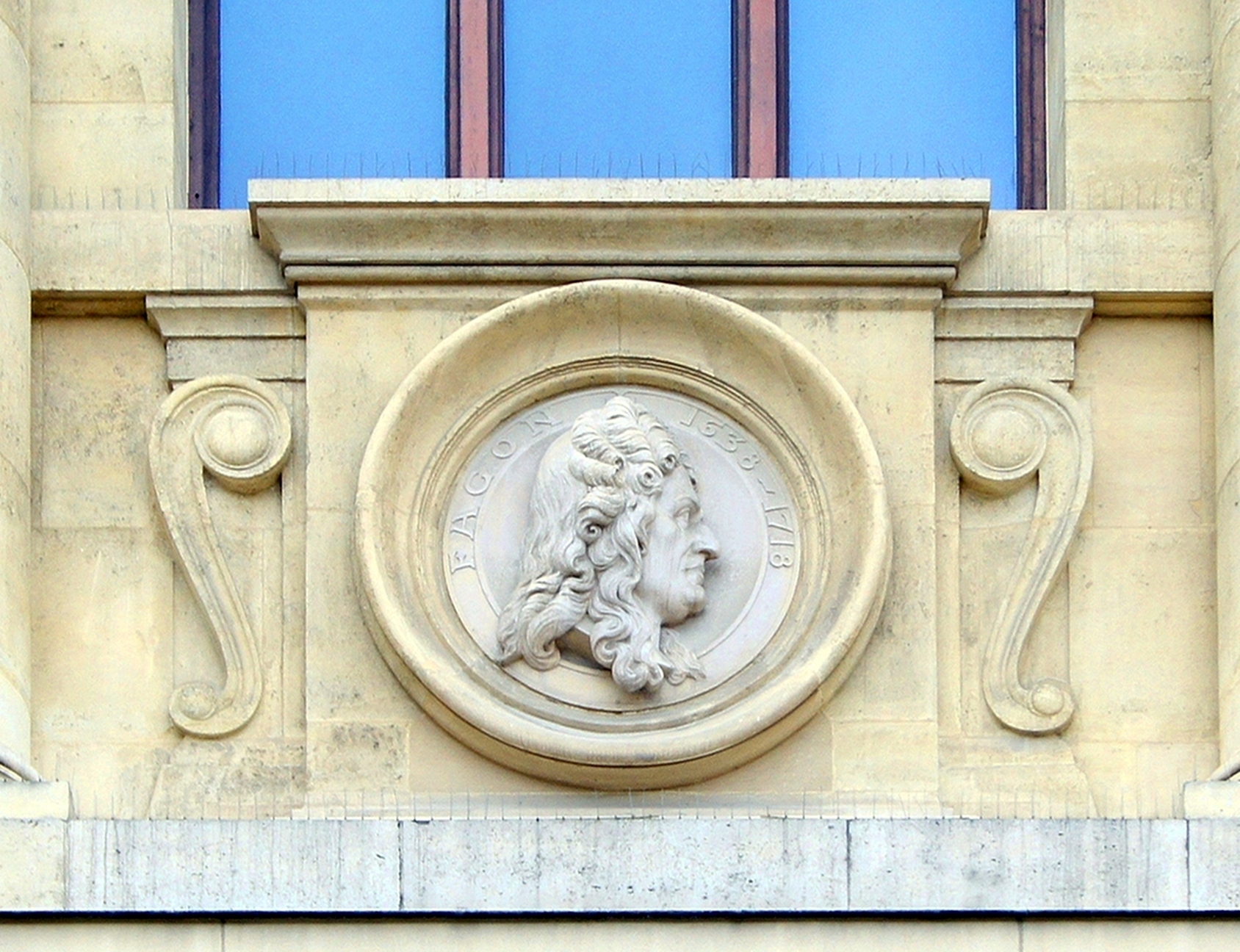
Guy-Crescent Fagon. Second medallion (left) on the façade of the grande galerie de l'Évolution, in the Jardin des plantes, in Paris.

His significance in botany is reflected in the genus Fagonia being named after him. He also acted as the physician of Louis XIV. In 1669 he was made an honorary member of the French Academy of Sciences. He wrote about the health of the royal family. He lost his position as head physician after Louis XIV's death, which was somewhat customary after a king died, but he also received criticism for how he had dealt with the King's final illness. People thought his methods were preposterous, and that he bled his patients to death. He was thought to have killed the Duc de Bourgogne (grandson of Louis XIV) and his wife the beloved Marie Adelaide. Despite this he remained in charge of the Royal Garden until his death in 1718.

== See also ==
- Claude Berger
