= Fossé =

Fossé may refer to the following communes in France:

- Fossé, Ardennes, in the Ardennes department
- Fossé, Loir-et-Cher, in the Loir-et-Cher department
- Le Fossé, in the Seine-Maritime department
