= Claude Joseph Geoffroy =

French apothecary and chemist

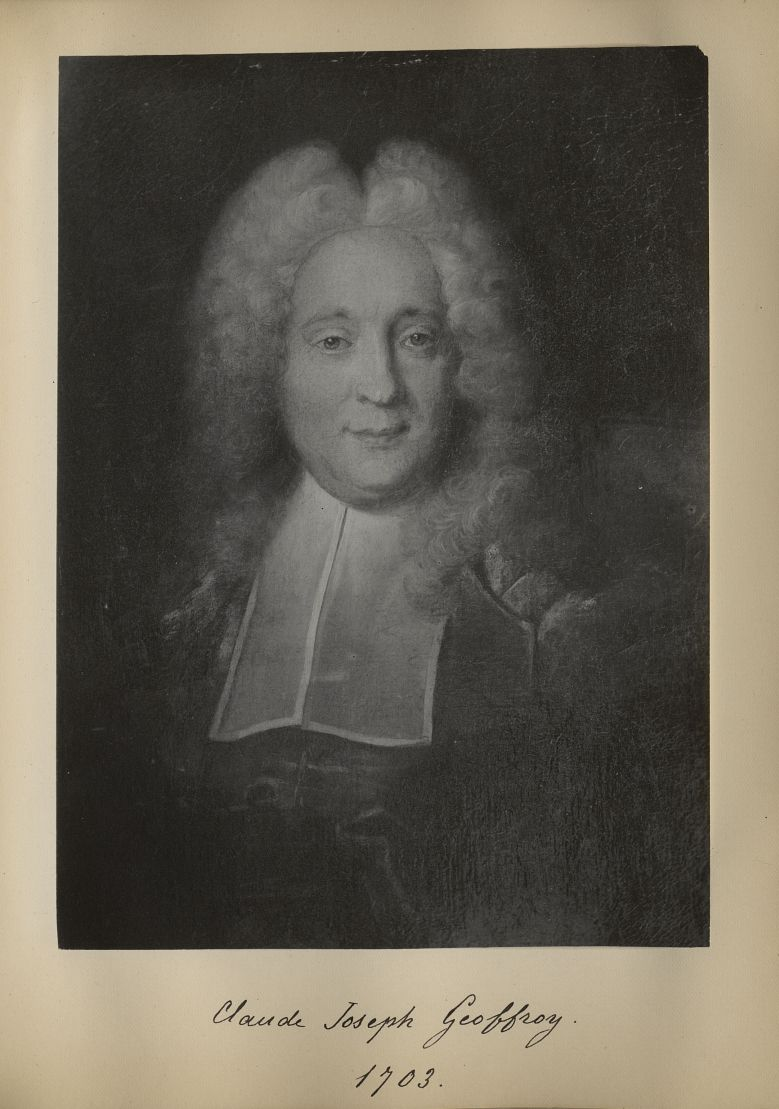
Claude Joseph Geoffroy

Claude Joseph Geoffroy (8 August 1685 in Paris – 9 March 1752 in Paris) was the brother of Étienne François Geoffroy. Like his brother, he was an apothecary and chemist. Having a considerable knowledge of botany, he devoted himself especially to the study of the essential oils in plants.

The son of Matthieu François Geoffroy and Louise Devaux, he was born in Paris on 8 August 1685. In 1703 he became a master apothecary, and in 1704/05 took scientific excursions throughout southern France. He then studied botany under Joseph Pitton de Tournefort (1707). In 1708, following the death of his father, he took charge of the family pharmacy. In May 1711 he was elected a member of the Académie Royale des Sciences (botany section), subsequently transferring to the "chemistry section" in 1715. From 1718 to 1720 he was Garde des marchands-apothicaires in Paris, then later served as inspecteur de pharmacie at the Hôtel-Dieu. In 1731 he attained the title of alderman in Paris.

From 1707 to 1751, he published numerous articles in the Histoire et Mémoires de l'Académie royale des sciences.

During 1729 Geoffroy used a method from Wilhelm Homberg “to determine the strength of vinegar by adding small amounts of potassium”, and this went to be the first ever titration recorded.

He is known as Geoffroy the Younger to distinguish him from his brother, Geoffroy the Elder (1672–1731). However, this leads to confusion with his son, Claude François Geoffroy (1729–1753), who is known as "Claude Geoffroy the Younger".

== Selected works ==
- Observations sur les huiles essentielles, avec quelques conjectures sur la cause des couleurs des feuilles et des fleurs des plantes, 1707.
- Observations sur les écrevisses de rivière, 1709.
- Observations sur la vegetation des truffes, 1711.
- Examen du vinaigre concentré par la gelée, 1729.
- Memoire dans lequel on examine si l'huile d'olive est un spécifique contre la morsure des viperes, 1737 (with François-Joseph Hunauld).
- "An account of the remedy for the stone, lately published in England, according to an act of Parliament, assigning a reward of 5000 [pounds] to the discoverer" (with Sauveur François Morand); published in English, 1741.
- Formules de pharmacie pour les hôpitaux militaires du roy, 1747 (with Sauveur François Morand).
