= Pierre Cureau de La Chambre =

French churchman (1640–1693)

Pierre Cureau de la Chambre (20 December 1640 in Paris – 15 April 1693 in Paris) was a French churchman.

== Biography ==
Son of the doctor Marin Cureau de la Chambre and brother of François Cureau de La Chambre, he was struck down with deafness and had to abandon his medical studies. He travelled to Italy and became friends with the sculptor Gian Lorenzo Bernini and the art historian Carlo Cesare Malvasia. He studied theology and in 1664 he published a collection of his father's works and attended the salon of the marquise de Sablé. A protégé of Colbert and a friend of Colbert's father chancelier Séguier, who had held him at his christening, he was elected to his father's seat in the Académie française in 1670. Around 1668, he became curé of the parish of Saint-Barthélémy in Paris. He died in the famine of 1693, during which he ran out of food trying to help the poorest of his parishioners.

La Chambre had a scholarly reputation and corresponded with Pierre de Fermat, but the only written works he left were panegyrics and funerary orations for Theresa of Avila, Bernini, Maria Theresa of Spain, Pierre Séguier, Rose de Sainte-Marie de Lima, Charles Borromeo and Saint Louis.
