= Pierre-César du Cambout, Marquis de Coislin =

17th-century French commander

Pierre-César du Cambout
- César du Cambout , marquis de Coislin (1613-1641)
- Born: 1613; Brittany, France
- Died: July 18, 1641 (aged 27–28); Aire-sur-la-Lys, Spanish Netherlands
- Title: Marquis de Coislin
- Spouse: Marie-Madeleine Séguier
- Parents: Charles du Cambout, marquis de Coislin (father); Philippa de Beurges (mother)
- Military career
- Rank: Lieutenant-general
- Commands: Commandant of Château de Brest, Colonel-general of the Swiss and the Grisons
- Conflicts: Thirty Years' War; Crossing of the Rhine; Retreat at Wallerfangen; Franco-Spanish War (1635-1659); Siege of Landrecies; Siege of Maubeuge; Siege of La Capelle; Siege of Hesdin; Ardennes campaign (1639); Siege of Arras (1640); Siege of Aire-sur-la-Lys (1641) †

Pierre-César du Cambout, Marquis de Coislin was a 17th-century French lieutenant-general and nobleman of the du Cambout family.

== Life ==
Pierre was born in Brittany, the son of Charles du Cambout, Marquis de Coislin, a French commander and first cousin of Cardinal Richelieu, and Philippa de Beurges. He served alongside his father in command of the Château de Brest, where the fortifications were restored. In 1635, following the resignation of François de Bassompierre, Pierre was promoted to "Lieutenant General of the King’s Armies, Colonel General of the Swiss and the Grisons."

Richelieu subsequently dispatched him to Upper Italy, soon followed by Michel Particelli d'Émery, who served as the French ambassador to Savoy. Their goal was to form an alliance of Italian states intended to counter Spanish influence in the region. At the same time several other figures were dispatched with the same goal: Pompone de Bellièvre and Gaspard Coignet, Seigneur de La Thuillerie to Venice, Louis de Briançon, Seigneur de La Saludie to the Swiss Cantons, Parma, Venice, and Tuscany, and Nicolas Bachelier, Seigneur de Coucy to Mantua. In 1637, he requested to join Cardinal La Valette at the Siege of Landrecies.

In the summer of 1639, he accompanied the Duke de La Meilleraye in the Ardennes and at the Siege of Hesdin. He also served at the Siege of Arras in 1640. In 1641, while besieged Aire-sur-la-Lys, he was wounded on July 11 and died six days later of his wounds. In a letter to the Prince of Condé, Richelieu wrote, "the loss I have suffered in the Marquis de Coislin, a loss that grieves me so profoundly that I cannot bring myself to say any more about it."

== Family ==
Although betrothed to Charlotte de Kerveno in 1632, Pierre ultimately married Marie-Madeleine Séguie on February 5, 1634. Their son was Armand du Cambout, the future first Duke of Coislin.
