= Pierre Dionis =

French physician

Pierre Dionis (1643 in Paris – 11 December 1718 in Paris) was a French surgeon and anatomist, First surgeon of the Enfants de France.

== Biography ==
Pierre Dionis was trained at the Confrérie de Saint-Côme et de Saint-Damien in Paris where he obtained the rank of master surgeon. He was influenced by the work of Guichard Joseph Duverney (1648–1730).

In 1669, Dionis was surgeon of the King and chirurgien par quartier of the Queen Maria Theresa. (Note: Physician per quarter: a physician who serves with a sovereign per quarter year.)

On 31 July 1671, the King Louis XIV appointed François Cureau de La Chambre as a Démonstrateur opérateur pour l’intérieur des plantes (Note: Demonstrator operator of the interior of plants: the composition of the medicines was associated with the "interior of the plants".) of the Botanical Garden (Jardin des Plantes). Too busy with his duties, François Cureau de La Chambre appointed Pierre Cressé, to read the lectures, while Pierre Dionis performed the actual dissections.

He was appointed surgeon by Louis XIV in 1672 to teach at the Jardin des Plantes “anatomy according to the circulation of the blood”, while the Faculty of Medicine in Paris contested William Harvey's discovery of blood circulation. Louis XIV had sided with the Moderns of the Garden against the Ancients of the Faculty.

In 1688, he was first surgeon to Madame la Dauphine, then in 1709, first surgeon to Duchess of Burgundy.

His work, "L'anatomie de l'homme suivant la circulation du sang et les dernières découvertes" (The anatomy of man according to the circulation of the blood and the latest discoveries), 1690, was a prodigious success and was even translated into Tartar.

== Works ==
- Dionis, Pierre (1690). L'anatomie de l'homme suivant la circulation du sang, & les dernières découvertes, démontrée au Jardin-royal (in French). — Translated into several languages including Latin and the “Tartar language of Mantcheou, or Eastern Tartar, by order of the Emperor of China”. English translation: 1716
- Dionis, Pierre (1710). Dissertation sur la mort subite. Avec l'Histoire d'une fille cataleptique. Paris: L. d'Houry.
- Dionis, Pierre (1718). Traité général des accouchements, qui instruit de tout ce qu'il faut faire pour être habile accoucheur (in French).. English translation: 1719
- Dionis, Pierre (1740). Cours d'opérations de chirurgie, démontrées au jardin royal, par M. Dionis, 4e édition, revue par G. de La Faye (in French).. Translated into English in 1710 and into German in 1712. The first edition is from 1707.
