= Wallot family =

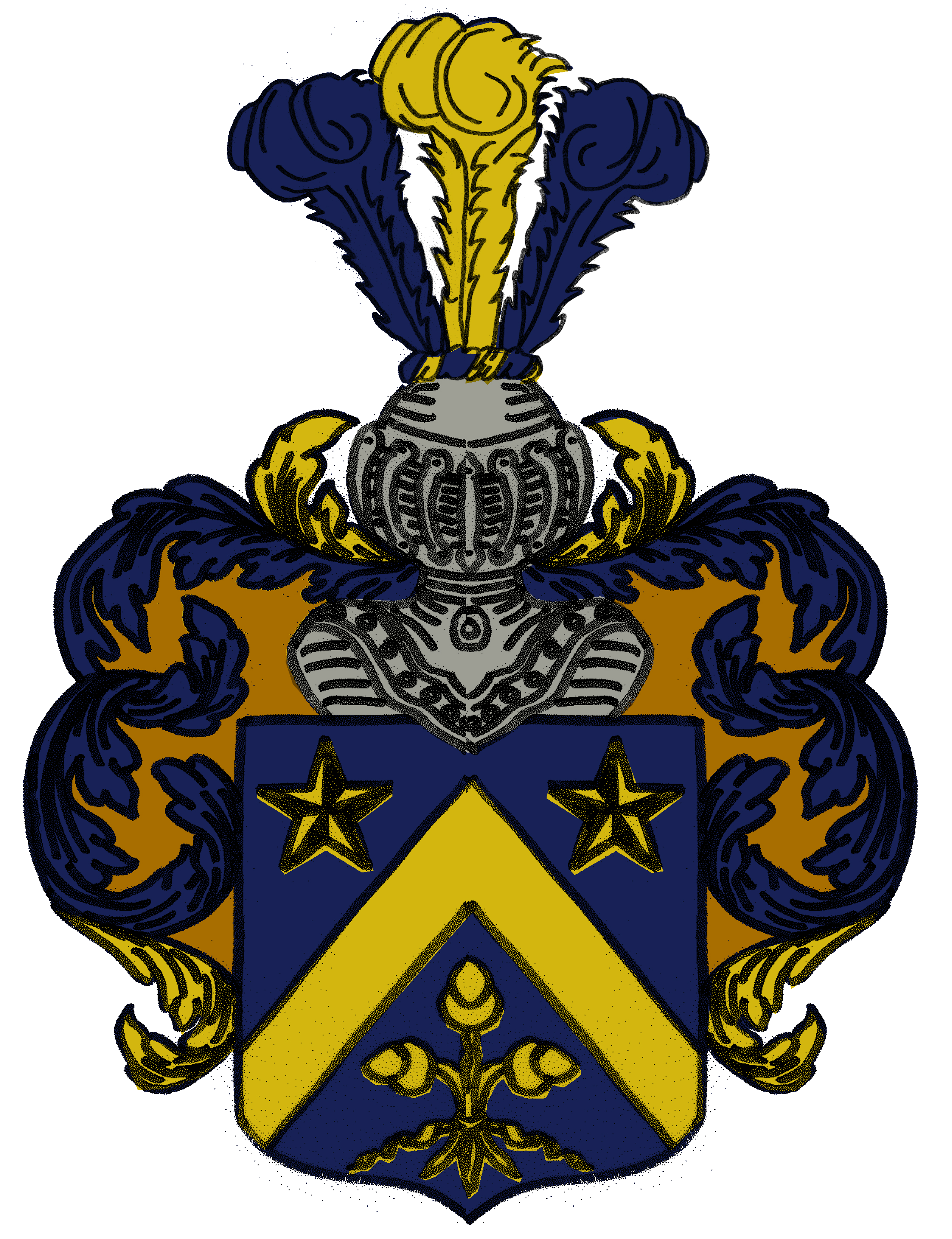
Family crest of the house Wallot/Vallot

The Wallot family is of Huguenot origin and goes back to the French noble house Vallot – presumably from Languedoc, France. The Vallot family gained popularity through Antoine Vallot, who served as the personal physician ( premier médecin du roi) of King Louis XIV. from 1652 until Louis’ death in 1671. Antoine Vallot was ennobled by King Louis XIV. in 1668. The French as well as the German branch of the family produced a number of well-known personalities, such as the architect of the German Reichstag Paul Wallot, the physicist Julius Wallot and Joseph Vallot, who erected the observatory Refuge Vallot on the Mont Blanc built that still exists today.

== History ==
=== Antoine Vallot ===
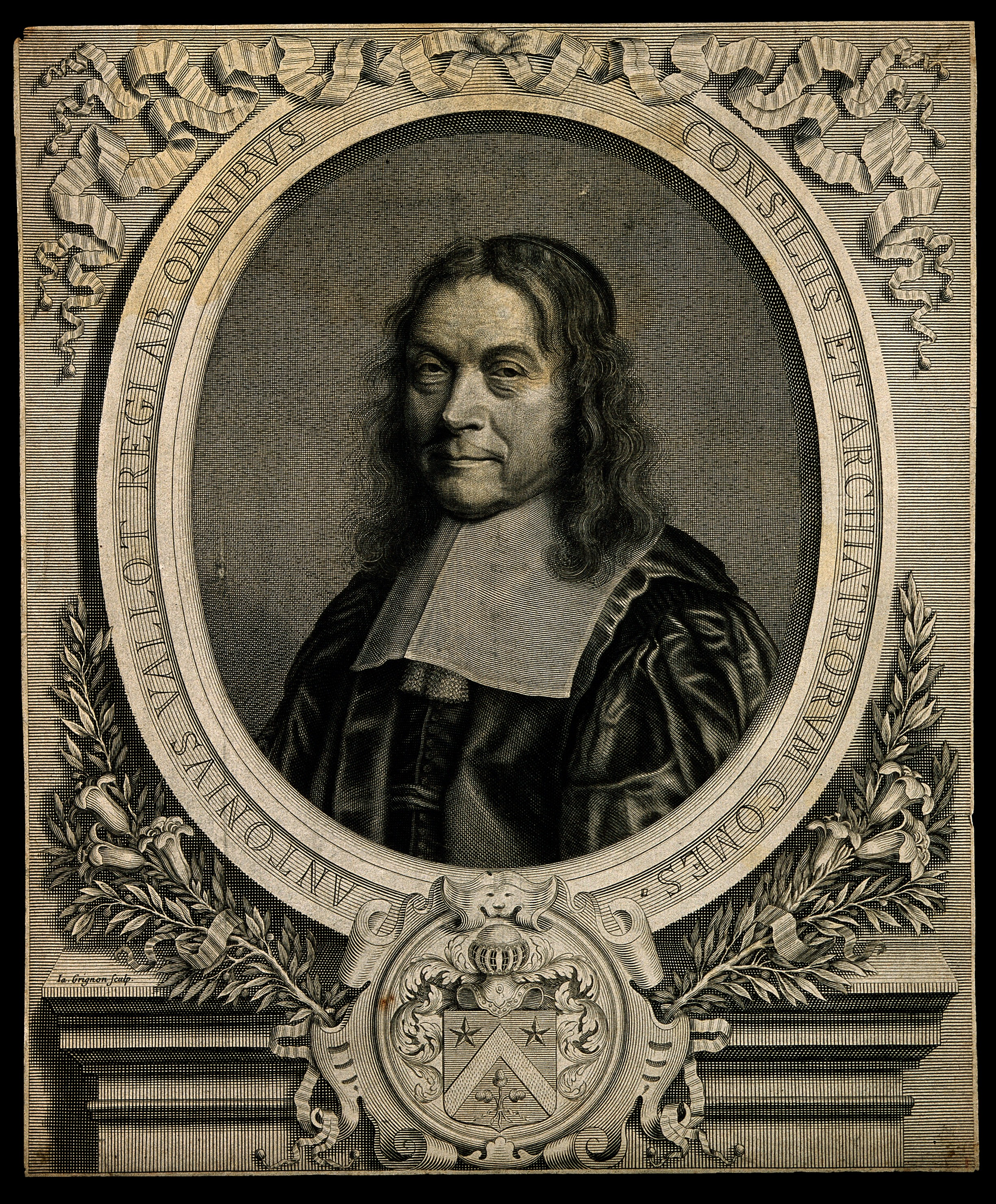
Antoine Vallot, Engraving by J. Grignon

Antoine Vallot became the personal physician of Louis XIV on July 8, 1652.

Born in 1596/6, Vallot earned his medical education at University of Reims. Documents also indicate a degree at the University of Montpellier; it is believed that Vallot began his studies in Reims, but graduated in Montpellier. Although the exact date of his arrival in Paris is unclear, Vallot was already in Paris in 1647 to a select circle of physicians who served the royal family. Vallot's patients soon included influential people at the French court, such as Cardinal Jules Mazarin. In addition, Vallot was said to have a close friendship with his previous royal physician Francois Vautier. It is believed that especially the latter compound contributed significantly to Vallot's appointment as royal physician in 1652.

In addition to his role as royal physician, Vallot held the offices of Head of Royal Baths, Fountains and Mineral Waters and Director of the Botanical Garden Paris (Jardin des Plantes). Vallot married Catherine Gayant, daughter of a wealthy Parisian family, in February 1634. The marriage produced two daughters and four sons.

In 1668, Vallot was given a peerage by King Louis XIV. Among the possessions of the family were the Château de la Magnanne and the Chateau de Neuville (Gambais), which was managed by Antoine Vallot's brother Jean-Baptiste.

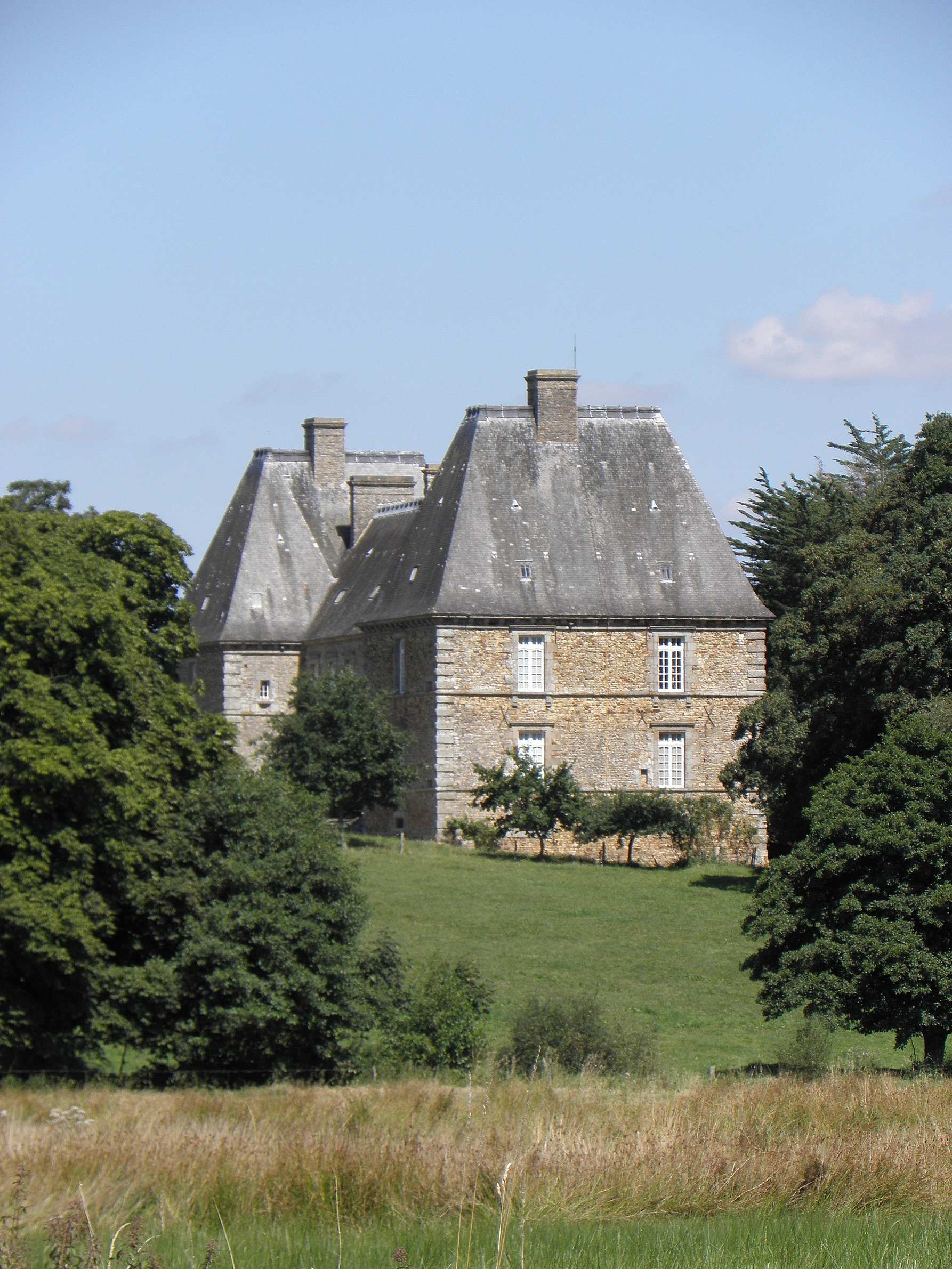
Château de La Magnanne

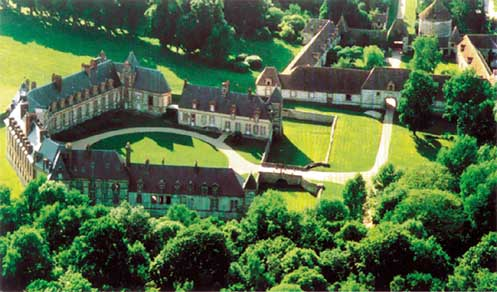
Aerial view of Château de Neuville (Gambais)

=== Escape to Germany ===
The Protestant part of the family became increasingly cornered about the suppression of the Huguenots by the Catholic clergy and from 1685 also on the king. After the death of Antoine Vallot in 1685, and the consecration of the Edict of Fontainebleau, resulting in the peak of suppression of Protestants in France in 1685, the Protestant part of the family left France in the 1680s to settle in Oppenheim.

As one of the most productive layers of society, rulers of neighbouring countries readily accepted Huguenots. In many places, Huguenots were granted privileges and credits, and in the countries where they immigrated, they were often responsible for the flourishing of the economy and especially agriculture. With the transformation of the original name Vallot into the German style of writing Wallot, the national assimilation of the family is considered to be completed.

=== Wallot in Oppenheim ===
Like Huguenot families in other German cities, the Wallot family influenced the city of Oppenheim. The influence of the family in Oppenheim is detectable until today – not least due to the prominence of Paul Wallot, who built the Reichstag building between 1884 and 1894.

Oppenheim hosts a Paul Wallot square and the Baptismal font in St. Catherine's Church in Oppenheim was designed by Paul Wallot and donated in 1888 by Paul’s father. The family crest of the family Wallot (Vallot) is incorporated in the window of the St. Catherine's Church. The family also ran a vineyard in Oppenheim, which exists under different ownership until today.

On the Oppenheimer cemetery is the family grave of the Wallot family. In the centre of the family grave is a Doric Aedicule in honour of Paul Wallot and his wife, which was designed by the Swiss architect Alfred Friedrich Bluntschli. On the aedicule, there is a profile picture of Paul Wallot in bronze.

Paul Wallot's birthplace at Krämerstraße 7 still exists today and currently houses a restaurant that runs a Paul Wallot room. The house also has a bronze plate in honor of Wallot. A special feature of the house are two side-by-side doorways bearing initials

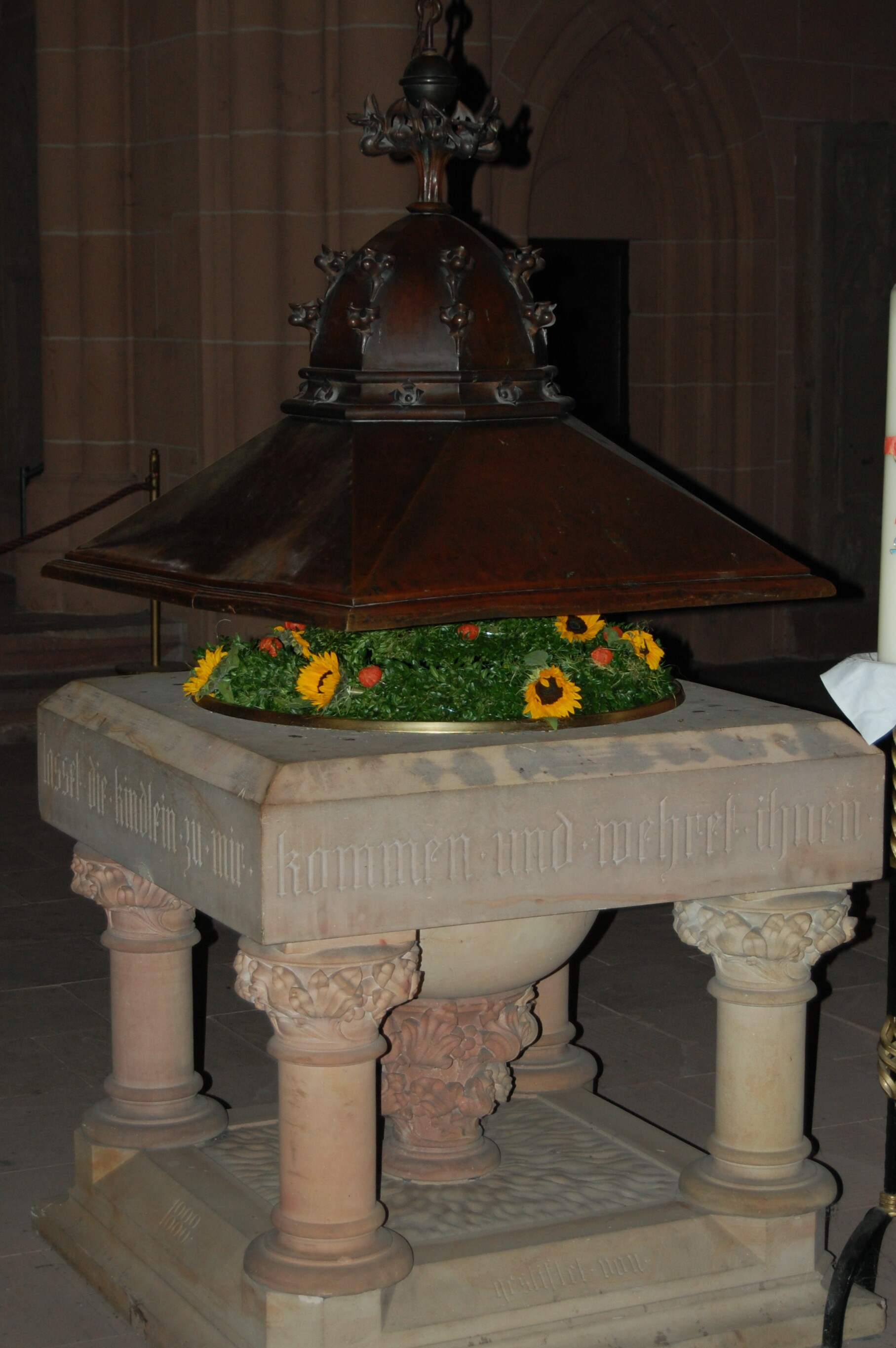
Baptismal font, Katharinenkirche, Oppenheim

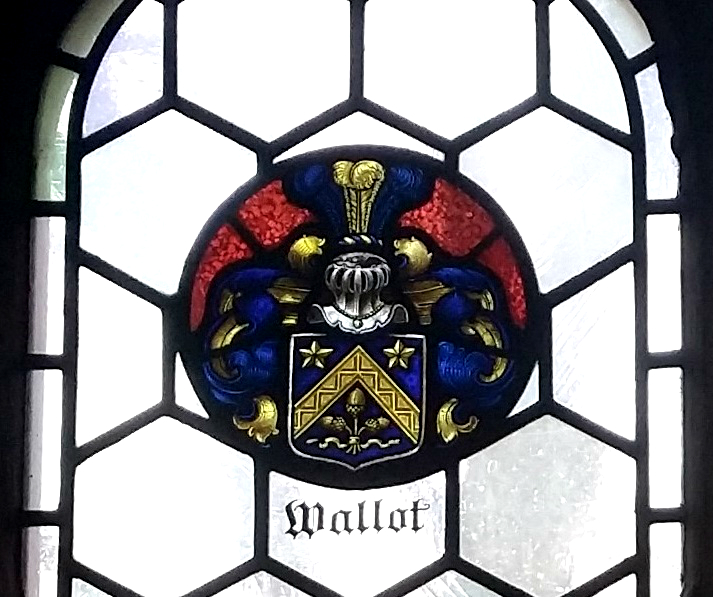
Coat of arms of the Wallot family in the window of the Katharinenkirche, Oppenheim

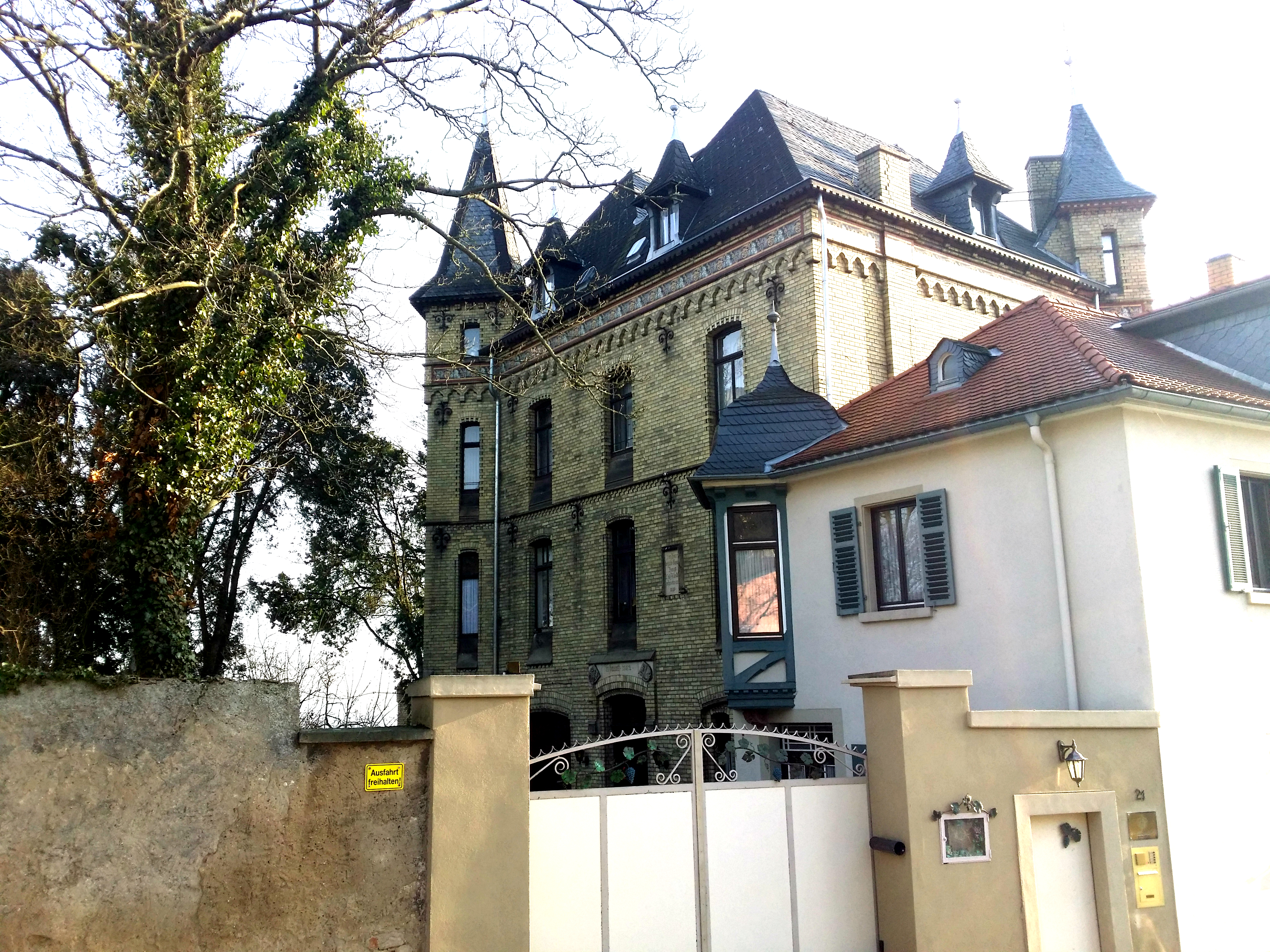
Former winery of the Wallot family in Oppenheim

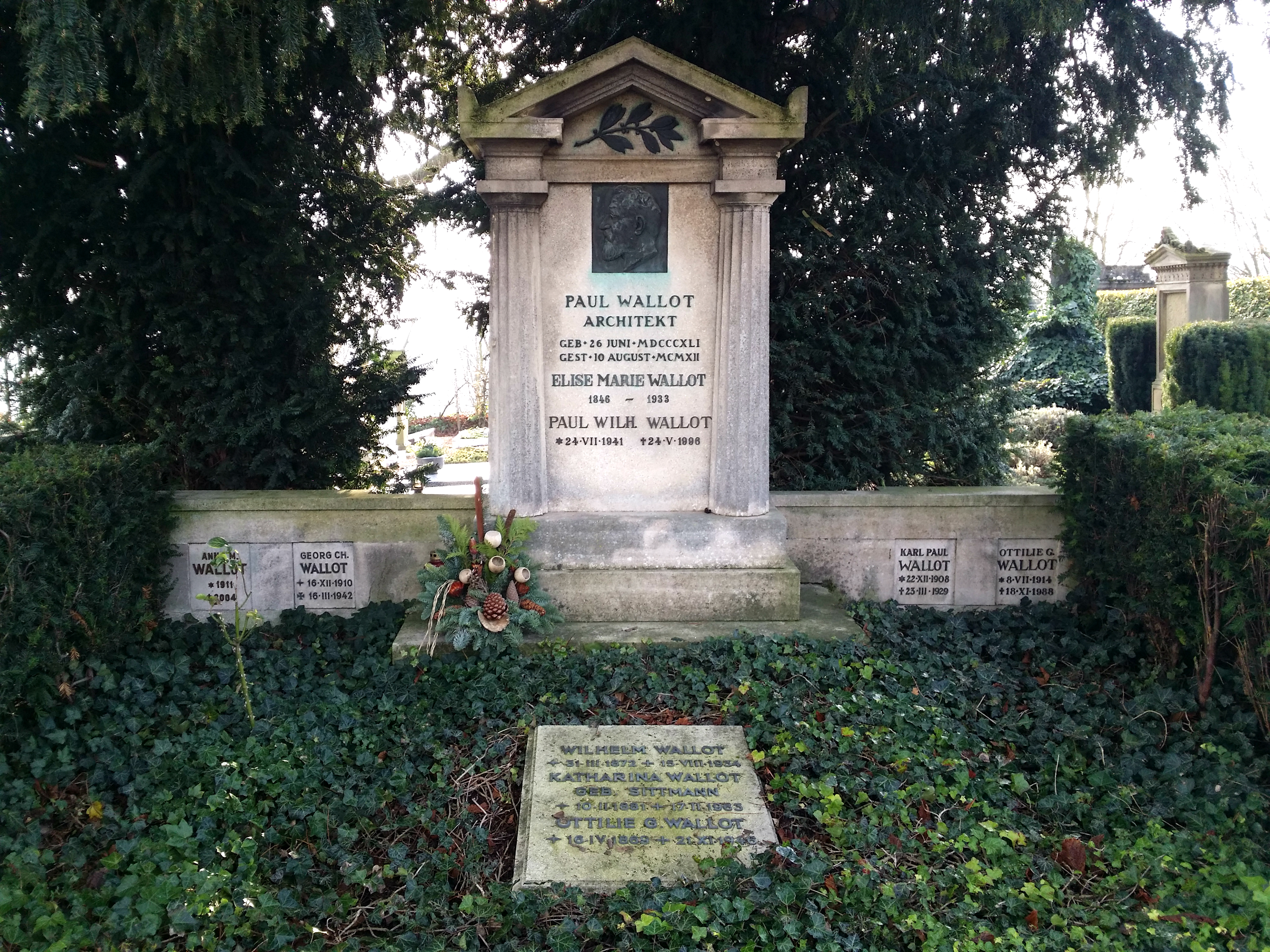
Family grave Wallot in Oppenheim

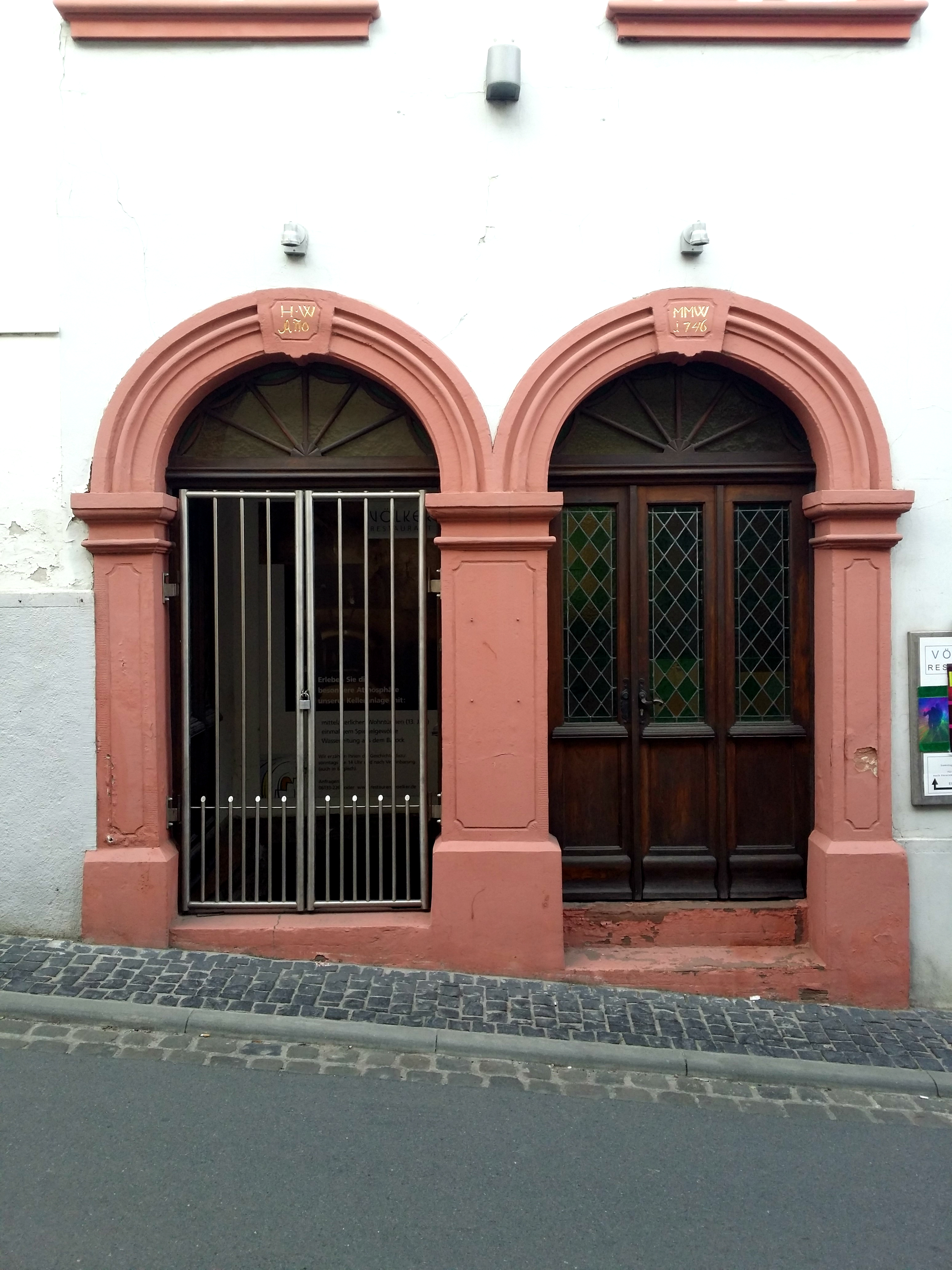
Birthplace Paul Wallot, Krämerstraße 7 in Oppenheim

== Coat of arms ==
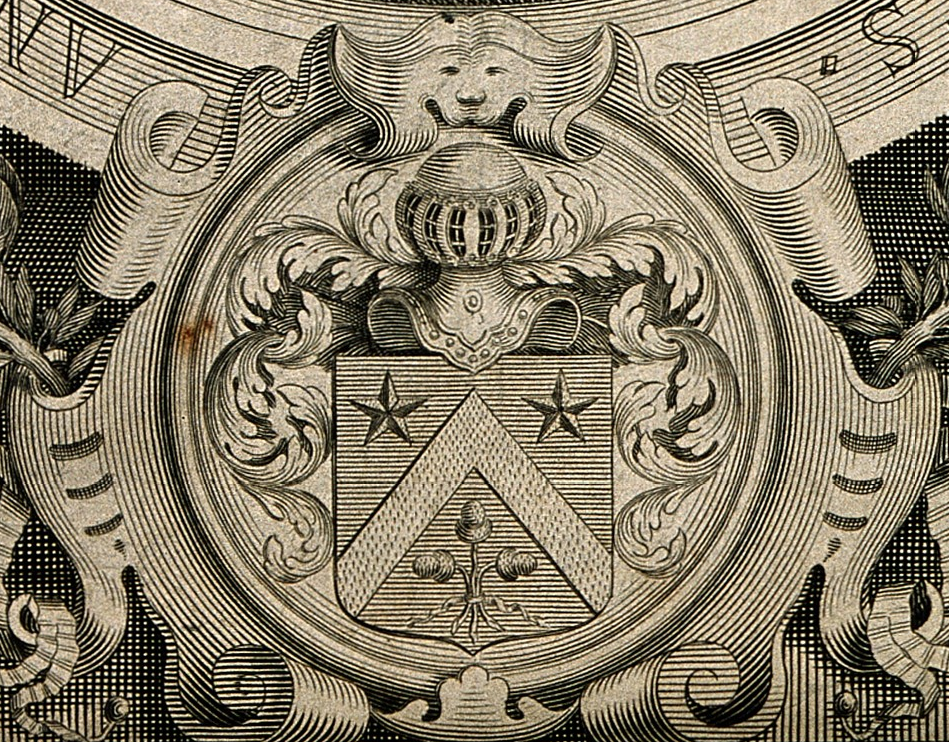
Detail of an engraving by J. Grignon, showing theWallot/Vallot’s family crest (Entire Engraving)

The exact origin of the family’s coat of arms is unknown. However, the coat of arms was already worn by Antoine Vallot and, thus, must be at least from the 17th century.

The shield is in the form of "Tiercé en chevron", which was a symbol of protection and conservation, martial valor, resistance and strength. The tincture of the coat of arms is held in blue and gold. The golden rafter is accompanied above by two golden stars. Below is a bundle of three golden acorns tied together with a golden ribbon. The helmet is held in silver and has seven grids. The crest consists of a golden between two blue ostrich feathers. In addition, the helmet is surrounded by blue-golden blankets.

== Notable members of the family ==
- Antoine Vallot (French Wikipedia) (1596/6-1671), personal physician of Louis XIV.
- Johann Wilhelm Wallot (German Wikipedia) (also Jean Guillaume) (1743-1794), German-French astronomer
- Paul Wallot (1841-1912), architect of the German Reichstag building
- Joseph Vallot (French Wikipedia) (1854-1925), astronomer and geologist
- Julius Wallot (German Wikipedia) (1876-1960), German physicist

== Literature ==
- Natalie Hawkes: Beyond the Sun King’s bedside. Antoine Vallot and the broader identity of the premier médecin du roi in Louis XIV’s reign. PhD thesis, Newcastle University, 2014 (PDF; 2,1 MB).
- Léon Moulé: Lettre d'Anoblissement pour Antoine Vallot, premier médecin du Roi. In: Bulletin de la Société française d'histoire de la médecine, 1912, Nummer 11, S. 193–197 (online; Standeserhebung durch Louis XIV. im Originaltext)
- Maximilian Rapsilber: Das Reichstags-Gebäude. Seine Baugeschichte und künstlerische Gestaltung sowie ein Lebensabriss seines Erbauers Paul Wallot. Cosmos, Berlin 1895 (online).

== See also ==
- Huguenots
- Families
- French nobility
