= Guillaume Lamy =

Guillaume Lamy (1644–1683) was a French physician best known for his sympathies with Epicurean philosophy, and for his influence on materialists such as La Mettrie.

He engaged in a lively dispute with Pierre Cressé over anatomical treatises, notably concerning the seat of the human soul.

Lamy was doctor at the Medical Faculty of Paris and attracted both criticism and praise from fellow physicians for his attempts to take medicine in new directions based on Epicurean philosophy. In 1682 he published Traité de l'antimoine.
