= Gilles-François Boulduc =

French chemist (1675–1741)

Gilles-François Boulduc (born 20 February 1675 in Paris; died 17 January 1741 in Versailles) was a French pharmacist and chemist. (Note: All but one reference gives 20 February 1675 as the date of birth. The closest reference to this date of death is that of his eulogy by Jean-Jacques d'Ortous de Mairan in the Histoire de l'Académie Royale des Sciences in 1742)

== Biography ==
Boulduc was the son of Simon Boulduc (1652-1729), apothecary and chemistry demonstrator at the Royal Academy of Sciences. Gilles-François apprenticed as a pharmacist, studied Descartes' physics with Pierre-Sylvain Régis and medicine with Antoine de Saint-Yon at the Jardin du Roi.

He was received on 14 March 1695, at the age of twenty, as a master apothecary then admitted to the apothecaries' guild.

On 14 February 1699 he became a chemist's student of his father, at the Royal Academy of Sciences. He became apothecary to Madame Palatine in 1705 and held the position until 1722. In 1712 he became apothecary to King Louis XIV and remained so after his death, for King Louis XV. He did research at the Académie des Sciences from 1699, where he became assistant chemist in 1716 and associate chemist in 1727, succeeding François Pourfour du Petit.

In 1717, he became judge of the commercial court (“Consul”), then, in 1726, an alderman of the city of Paris. This office ennobled him and allowed him to bear the title of squire.

In 1731, he hosted Georges Buffon who arrived in Paris after his European tour.

From 1736 to 1742, he was apothecary to Queen Marie Leszczyńska.

== Works ==
Boulduc analysed organic substances and medicines. Dissatisfied with the dry distillation method, he studied the use of different solvents and examined, for example, the differences between aqueous and alcoholic solutions of organic substances.

He was interested in laxatives (such as Ecballium elaterium) and worked a lot on salts, such as on the cathartic salt of Spain, produced by a spring near Madrid; on the salt of Dauphiné extracted from the earth near Grenoble (Glauber's salt); on the polycreste salt of Seignette; and on that of Epsom.

Following Pierre Cressé, he researched the composition of the mineral waters of Passy and Forges as well as the waters of Bourbon-l'Archambault.
