= Duverney fracture =

- Specialty: Orthopedic

Duverney fractures are isolated pelvic fractures involving only the iliac wing. They are caused by direct trauma to the iliac wing, and are generally stable fractures as they do not disrupt the weight bearing pelvic ring.

The fracture is named after the French surgeon Joseph Guichard Duverney who described the injury in his book Maladies des Os which was published posthumously in 1751.

== Presentation ==
=== Complications ===
Malunion and deformity of the iliac wing can occur. Injury to the internal iliac artery can occur, leading to hypovolaemic shock. Perforation of the bowel can occur, leading to sepsis. Damage to the adjacent nerves of the lumbosacral plexus has also been described.

== Diagnosis ==
Duverney fractures can usually be seen on pelvic X-rays, but CT scans are required to fully delineate the fracture and to look for associated fractures involving the pelvic ring.

== Management ==
Since fractures that do not involve the weight bearing part of the pelvic ring tend to be stable fractures, they can often be managed without surgery. These fractures tend to be very painful, so walking aids such as crutches or walking frames may be needed until the pain settles.

Open reduction internal fixation is sometimes required to correct deformity, and surgery may be required if there is damage to blood vessels, nerves or organs, or if the fracture is open.
