= Armand du Cambout, 1st Duke of Coislin =

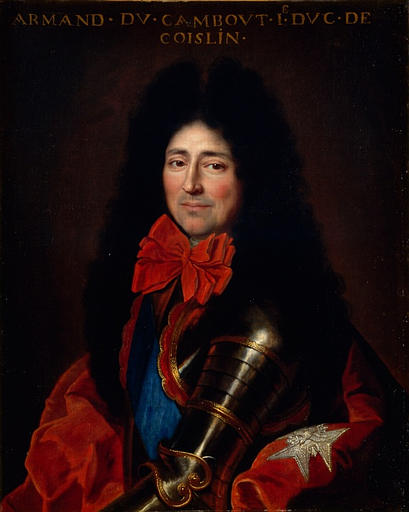
Armand du Cambout, 1st Duke of Coislin

Armand du Cambout, 1st Duke of Coislin (1 September 1635, Paris – 16 September 1702) was a French lieutenant général des armées du roi, and a duke and peer of France. The son of Pierre-César du Cambout, Marquis de Coislin, a colonel in the Swiss Guards, he was elected a member of the Académie Française in 1652 aged 16 and a half. After his death his seat was then held by his two sons, Pierre and Henri-Charles.
