= Antoine de Saint-Yon =

French physician and chemist

Antoine de Saint-Yon was a French physician and chemist of the late 17th and early 18th centuries.

== Biography ==
Antoine de Saint-Yon passed his medical thesis in 1671 with the title: An instante febrium excandescentia, accessione, purgandum?

In 1677, he practised as a docteur regent (Note: Title formerly given to doctors who were professors in theology, law or medicine of Paris.) at the Faculty of Medicine in Paris and was dean from 1704 to 1706. He was médecin par quartier of the King Louis XVI. (Note: Physician per quarter: a physician who serves with a sovereign per quarter year.)

He was a substitute professor for Guy-Crescent Fagon at the chair of chemistry in the Jardin du Roi in 1695, 1707 and 1715. Among his students were Sébastien Vaillant and Gilles-François Boulduc.

Antoine de Saint-Yon died without having left any writing on medicine or chemistry.
