= Claude Berger =

French doctor and chemist

Claude Berger (January 20, 1679, Paris – May 22, 1712, Passy) was a French medical doctor and chemist.

== Biography ==
He was a medical doctor from the Faculty of Paris and received his degree in medicine in 1669, after presenting a thesis under the presidency of Guy-Crescent Fagon, first physician to the king, against the use of tobacco. Claude Berger was related to Fagon, but the latter only knew him during this thesis. Fagon subsequently granted him his friendship and protection. He worked on the study of plants with Joseph Pitton de Tournefort, who appreciated him and recruited him as his pupil at the Royal Academy of Sciences. Berger joined the Academy on February 14, 1699.

After various arrangements inside the academy, he became a pupil of Guillaume Homberg on January 27, 1700. Having been received as a doctor of medicine, he was obliged to give lessons at the Schools of Paris for two years, where he was quite successful. He visited the sick with his father and replaced him for the last two years of his father’s life, from 1703. He succeeded his father after his death and was appointed doctor regent, in 1705. In 1708 he obtained the position of medical adviser to the king for 22,000 pounds, which required him to be present at Versailles the first quarter of each year.
