= Henri Charles du Cambout, 3rd Duke of Coislin =

French prelate

Henri Charles du Cambout
- Bishop of Metz
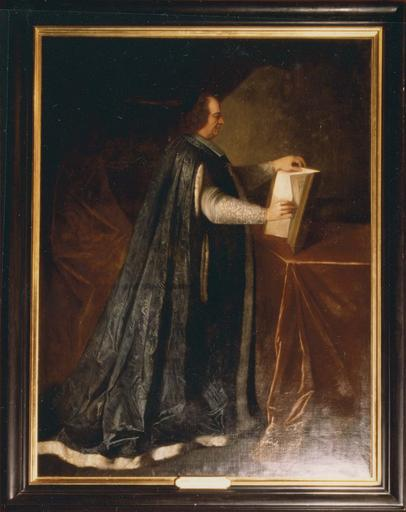
- Church: Catholic Church
- Diocese: Diocese of Metz
- In office: 11 November 1697 – 28 November 1732
- Predecessor: Georges d'Aubusson de La Feuillade
- Successor: Claude Charles de Rouvroy de Saint-Simon

Orders
- Ordination: 18 July 1694
- Consecration: 22 December 1697 by Pierre du Cambout

Personal details
- Born: 15 September 1665 Paris, Kingdom of France
- Died: 28 November 1732 (aged 67) Paris, Kingdom of France

Henri Charles du Cambout, 3rd Duke of Coislin (15 September 1665 – 28 November 1732) was a French prelate. He was bishop of Metz from 1697 to 1732, and duc de Coislin from 1710.

== Biography ==
Great-grandson of chancellor Séguier, brother of Pierre de Camboust and nephew of Pierre du Cambout de Coislin, on 20 June 1714 he composed a mandate denying the papal bull Unigenitus, which produced a sensation throughout the French church due to its author's personality, his diocese's importance and the sharpness of its condemnation of the bull, concealed beneath apparent submission to it. Louis XIV condemned the mandate by a Conseil decree of 5 July 1714 "as contrary to the acceptance of the Bull passed by the assembly of the clergy of France, and seeking to weaken or render useless the condemnation, both the errors contained in its 101 propositions, and the book that contains them". For refusing to seal this decree, chancellor de Pontchartrain was dismissed.

Henri-Charles de Coislin was an honorary member of the Académie des inscriptions et belles-lettres and the Académie française (from 1710).

He bequeathed to the abbaye de Saint-Germain the rich library he had himself inherited from chancellor Séguier, whose remnants have since 1793 been reunited in the Bibliothèque nationale de France.

Bishop of France's most important stronghold, he relieved the city's burden of billeting soldiers by building a barracks on place du Champ at Seille - the barracks were bounded by 4 streets honouring the patron saints of Henri and his family (rue Saint Charles, rue Saint Henri, rue du Cambout and rue de Coislin). These barracks were demolished around 1930 to allow the construction of place Coislin (named after him), subsequently substantially rebuilt in the years after the Second World War to house a bus terminus, then a vast town-centre car park.

== See also ==
- Fonds Coislin
