= Forges-les-Eaux =

- Commune
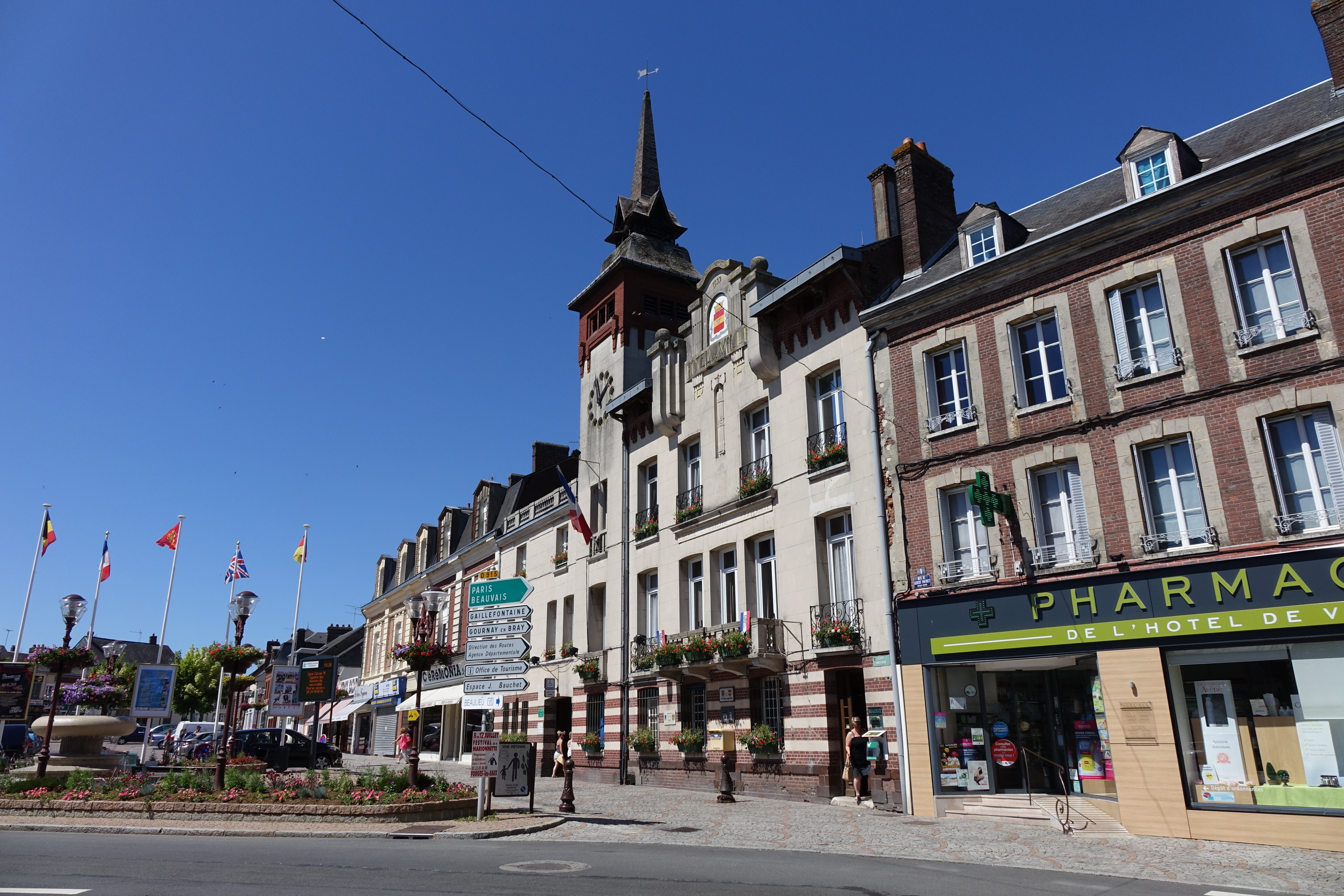
- The town hall in Forges-les-Eaux

- Coat of arms
- Location of Forges-les-Eaux
- Location within France Location within Normandy
- Coordinates: 49°36′48″N 1°32′44″E
- Country: France
- Region: Normandy
- Department: Seine-Maritime
- Arrondissement: Dieppe
- Canton: Gournay-en-Bray
- Intercommunality: CC 4 rivières

Government
  - Mayor (2026–32): Christine Lesueur
- Area^{1}: 15.33 km^{2} (5.92 sq mi)
- Elevation: 161 m (528 ft)
- Highest elevation: 171 m (561 ft)
- Lowest elevation: 124 m (407 ft)
- Population (2023): 3,642
  - Density: 237.6/km^{2} (615.3/sq mi)
- Time zone: UTC+01:00 (CET)
  - Summer (DST): UTC+02:00 (CEST)
- INSEE/Postal code: 76276 /76440
- ^{1} French Land Register data, which excludes lakes, ponds, glaciers > 1 km^{2} (0.386 sq mi or 247 acres) and river estuaries.

Forges-les-Eaux (French pronunciation: [fɔʁʒ le.z‿o]; Norman: Forges-les-iaux) is a commune in the Seine-Maritime department in the Normandy region in northern France. On 1 January 2016, the former commune of Le Fossé was merged into Forges-les-Eaux.

== Geography ==
A farming and spa town, with considerable light industry, situated by the banks of the rivers Andelle and Epte, in the Pays de Bray, some 34 miles (55 km) southeast of Dieppe, at the junction of the D 915, D 921, D1314 and D 919 roads.

== History ==
Known as "De Forgis" in 1186, the first part of the name, Forges, is derived from the fact that it was an important centre for the mining and manufacturing of iron in Roman times. The second part of its name comes from the therapeutic use of the thermal waters from the sixteenth century onwards.
A seigneur from Forges took part in the Battle of Hastings and another took part in the First Crusade.
During the Hundred Years War, a certain Philippe de Forges was killed in 1356 at the Battle of Poitiers. Years later, but in the same conflict, the English besieged the castle and took the town, in 1418.
Blanche d'Evreux, widow of Philippe VI of France, came here to take the waters in the fourteenth century, but it was the Chevalier de Varenne who really began the vogue in 1573. The spa became famous after the stay from 21 June to 13 July 1632 of Louis XIII, Anne of Austria and Cardinal Richelieu. Because of the royal visit, the parks, gardens and many water sources were developed, including three lakes that still exist today. Subsequently, many famous figures from French history have taken the waters. In 1657, the Regent Doctor of the Faculty of Medicine in Paris, Pierre Cressé, wrote a thesis on the waters of Forges which he compared to those of Passy then the chemist Gilles-François Boulduc, apothecary to King Louis XIV, studied their composition.
A large pottery factory was active from 1797 to the end of the nineteenth century.
The casino was first built in the nineteenth century but destroyed by fire in 1896. It was rebuilt and reopened in 1902.

1906 saw the first (in France) annual butter conventions.

The railway station was opened in the nineteenth century and runs a TER service to Gisors and Dieppe.

The film "Poulet au vinaigre" (1985) by Claude Chabrol, with Stephane Audran (Released in the US as "Cop au Vin,") was filmed in Forges-les-Eaux.[Film credits]

=== Heraldry ===
Arms of Forges-les-Eaux	The arms of Forges-les-Eaux are blazoned : Gules, on a fess Or between 12 hammers fesswise argent, an anvil sable.

== Population ==
Historical population
Year	Pop.	±% p.a.
1968	3,358	—
1975	3,588	+0.95%
1982	3,914	+1.25%
1990	3,735	−0.58%
1999	3,846	+0.33%
2007	3,978	+0.42%
2012	3,997	+0.10%
2017	3,805	−0.98%
2023	3,642	−0.73%
Source: Population in geography as of January 2025, INSEE

== Places of interest ==
- The nineteenth century church of St. Eloi.
- A seventeenth century Carmelite convent.
- A feudal motte.
- The casino.
- The château de la Minière.
- Three museums.
- A 45 km paved bicycle path along a disused rail line to Dieppe

== Notable people ==
- Jean Le Chapelier, politician, lived here.

== Twin towns ==
- Battice, Herve, in Belgium since 1960.
- Heathfield, East Sussex, in England.
- Wennigsen, Lower Saxony, in Germany since 1997.

== See also ==
- Communes of the Seine-Maritime department
