= Marin Cureau de la Chambre =

French physician and philosopher (1594–1669)

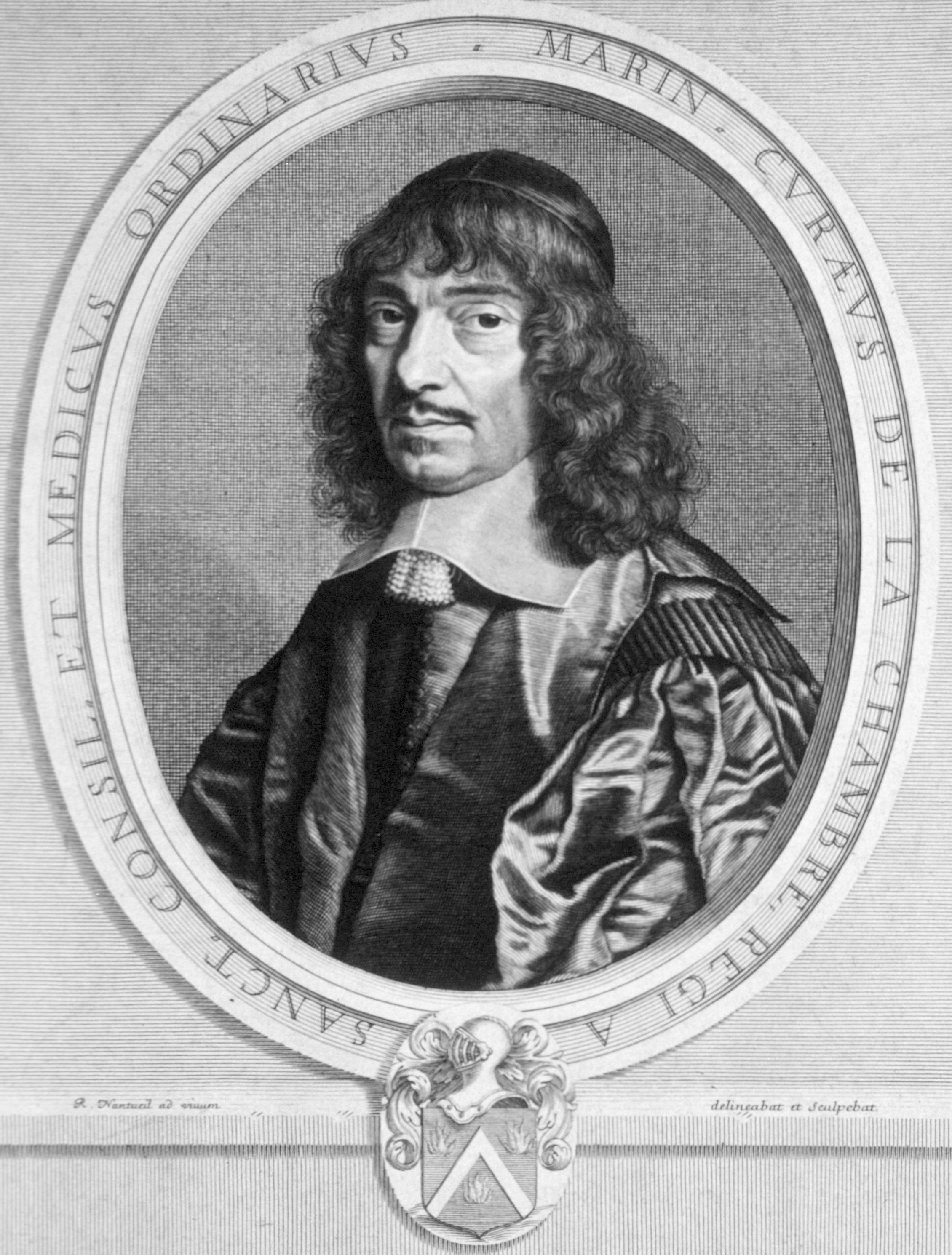
Marin Cureau de la Chambre

Marin Cureau de la Chambre (1594 – 29 December 1669) was a French physician and philosopher born in Saint-Jean-d'Assé, a village near Le Mans.

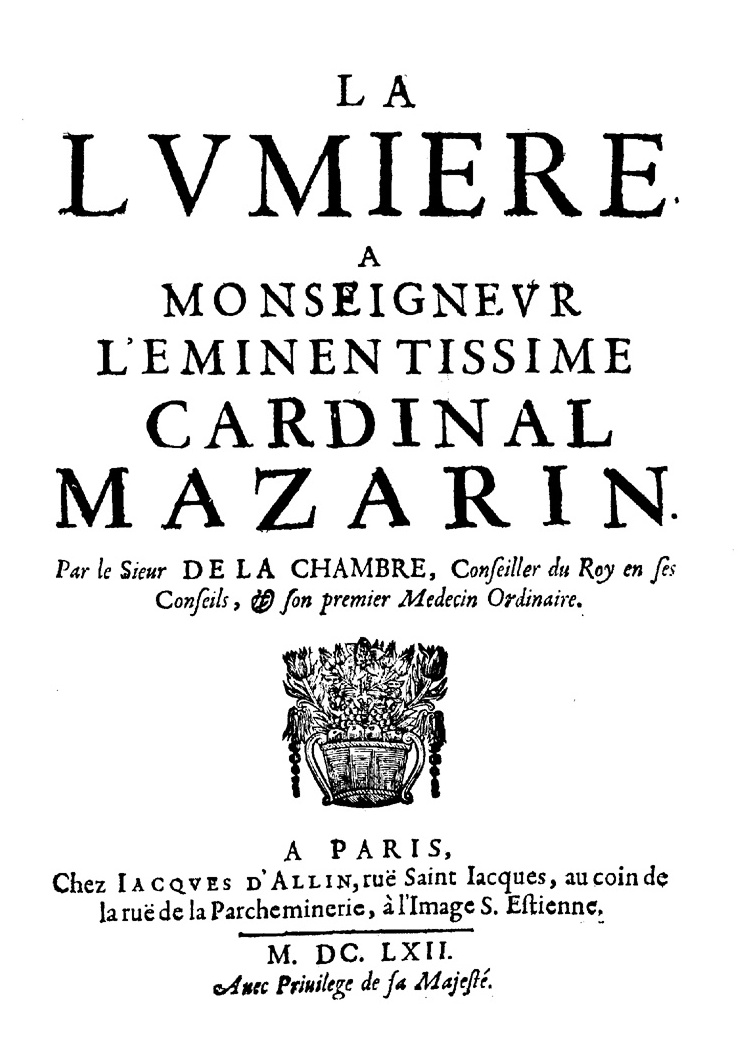
La lumiere, 1662

Details of his youth and where he attended school are unknown. He was initially a physician in Le Mans, and around 1630 moved to Paris, where he became a friend and physician to Pierre Séguier (1588–1672). Afterwards, he was a médecin ordinaire to Louis XIV. Reportedly the monarch was impressed by Cureau de la Chambre's ability to judge human character based on physical appearance.

Marin Cureau de la Chambre is largely known for his work in physiognomy. Between 1640 and 1662 he published a five-volume study on mans' character and "passions" called Caractères des passions. He wrote articles on many other topics, including palmistry, digestion, "reasoning" in animals, occult practices and optics. On the latter subject he investigated the nature of light and color, refractions, and the possibility of primary and secondary colors. He was the author of books on philosophy, and published a translation of Aristotle's Physica.

In 1634 he became an early member of the Académie française, and in 1666 was an original member of the French Academy of Sciences. He was the father of clergyman Pierre Cureau de La Chambre (1640–1693) and of François Cureau de La Chambre (1630-1680) who succeeded him at the Botanical Garden (Jardin des Plantes).. He died in Paris on December 29, 1669.

In 1991 astronomer Eric Walter Elst named the asteroid 7126 Cureau after Marin Cureau de la Chambre.

== Works ==
- Lumiere (in French). Paris: Jacques Dallin. 1662.
- Nouvelles observations et coniectures sur l'iris (in French). Paris: Jacques Dallin. 1662.
