= Pierre Cressé =

French physician

Pierre Cressé (1632 - 1714) was a 17th-century French physician during the reign of Louis XIV.

== Biography ==
He was related to Molière's mother, Marie Cressé (1601-1632).

In 1657 he defended a thesis on the mineral waters of Passy and of Forges-les-Eaux and another thesis on the effect of tea on gout.

An ardent galenist and defender of finalism in medicine, he practised as a docteur regent (Note: Title formerly given to doctors who were professors in theology, law or medicine of Paris.) at the Faculty of Medicine in Paris.

On 31 July 1671, the King Louis XIV appointed François Cureau de La Chambre as a demonstrator operator of the interior of plants (Note: Démonstrateur opérateur pour l’intérieur des plantes: the composition of the medicines was associated with the "interior of the plants".) of the Botanical Garden (Jardin des Plantes). Too busy with his duties, François Cureau de La Chambre appointed Pierre Cressé, to read the lectures, while the surgeon Pierre Dionis performed the actual dissections.

He engaged in a lively dispute with Guillaume Lamy over anatomical treatises, notably concerning the seat of the human soul.
