= François-Joseph Hunauld =

French anatomist

François-Joseph Hunauld (24 February 1701 – 15 December 1742) was a French anatomist born in Châteaubriant, Province of Brittany.

In 1722 he received his medical degree at Reims, then continued his studies in Paris under Jacques Bénigne Winslow (1669–1760) and Guichard Joseph Duverney (1648–1730). In 1724 he became a member of the Académie des sciences. In 1730 he succeeded Duverney as instructor of anatomy at the Jardin du Roi, a position he kept until his death in 1742. He died in Paris.

He is remembered for his work in the field of a significant anatomical museum. Many of his writings were published in the Mémoires de l’Académie des sciences.

== Selected writings ==
- Dissertation en forme de lettres au sujet des ouvrages de l’auteur du livre sur les maladies des os, 1726.
- Discours sur les fièvres qui ont régné les années dernières.
- Nouveau traité de physique sur toute la nature, (two volumes) 1742.
