= Joseph Guichard Duverney =

French anatomist

- Born: 5 August 1648; Feurs, the Lyonnais
- Died: 10 September 1730 (aged 82); Paris
- Occupation: anatomist
- Known for: otology Duverney fracture discovery of occipital sinuses

Joseph Guichard Duverney or Joseph-Guichard Du Verney (French pronunciation: [ʒozɛf ɡiʃaʁ dyvɛʁnɛ]; 5 August 1648 – 10 September 1730) was a French anatomist known for his work in comparative anatomy and for his treatise on the ear. The fracture of the iliac wing of the pelvis is sometimes called the Duverney fracture.

== Biography ==
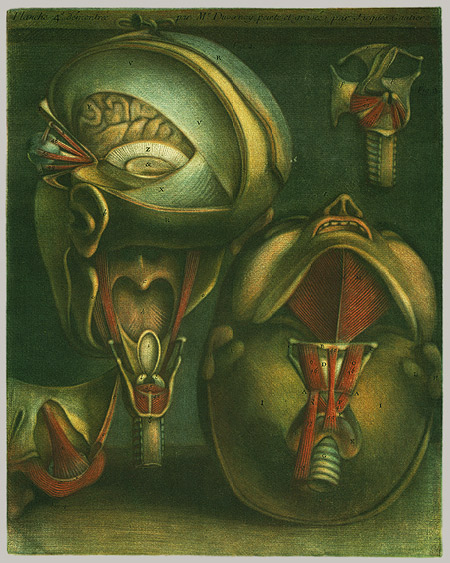
Plate by Jacques Gautier d'Agoty, showing the muscles of the head, published in 1747 in Du Verney's Myologie complete en couleur et grandeur naturelle

Du Verney was a native of Feurs in the province of Forez. His father Jacques Duverny was a doctor in the small community Feurs. His mother was born Antoinette Pittre. His two other older brothers studied medicine and he too studied at the University of Avignon, where in 1667 he obtained his medical degree. Shortly afterwards, he relocated to Paris where he was active in the circle of Abbé Pierre Michon Bourdelot where he came into contact with Claude Perrault. He became known for his assiduous anatomical dissections apart from dealing with patients. In 1676 he became the anatomist at the Royal Academy of Sciences to replace Louis Gayant (died 1673) and Jean Pecquet (died 1674). He began to dissect and compare a wide range of animals including fish with Philippe de La Hire. He also received animals from the royal menagerie for dissections, and in 1681 he dissected an elephant from the court of King Louis XIV. In 1682 he became a demonstrator of anatomy at the Jardin du Roi. In 1676 he became a member of the Académie des sciences. He is considered by many to be the founder of scientific otology.

Alongside Claude Perrault (1613-1688) and Jean Pecquet (1622-1674), he was influential in the renewal of anatomical studies. Some of his students included Pierre Dionis (1643-1718), Jacques-Bénigne Winslow (1669-1760), Jean-Baptiste Sénac (1693-1770) and François-Joseph Hunauld (1701-1742). Towards the end of his life he was working on hearing and the ear with Jacques Bénigne Winslow. He died from heart complications. Several works were published posthumously. He willed his anatomical specimens to the Royal Academy but this was challenged by Pierre Chirac (1648–1732), supervisor at the Jardin who said the specimens belonged to the King.

== Contributions to science ==
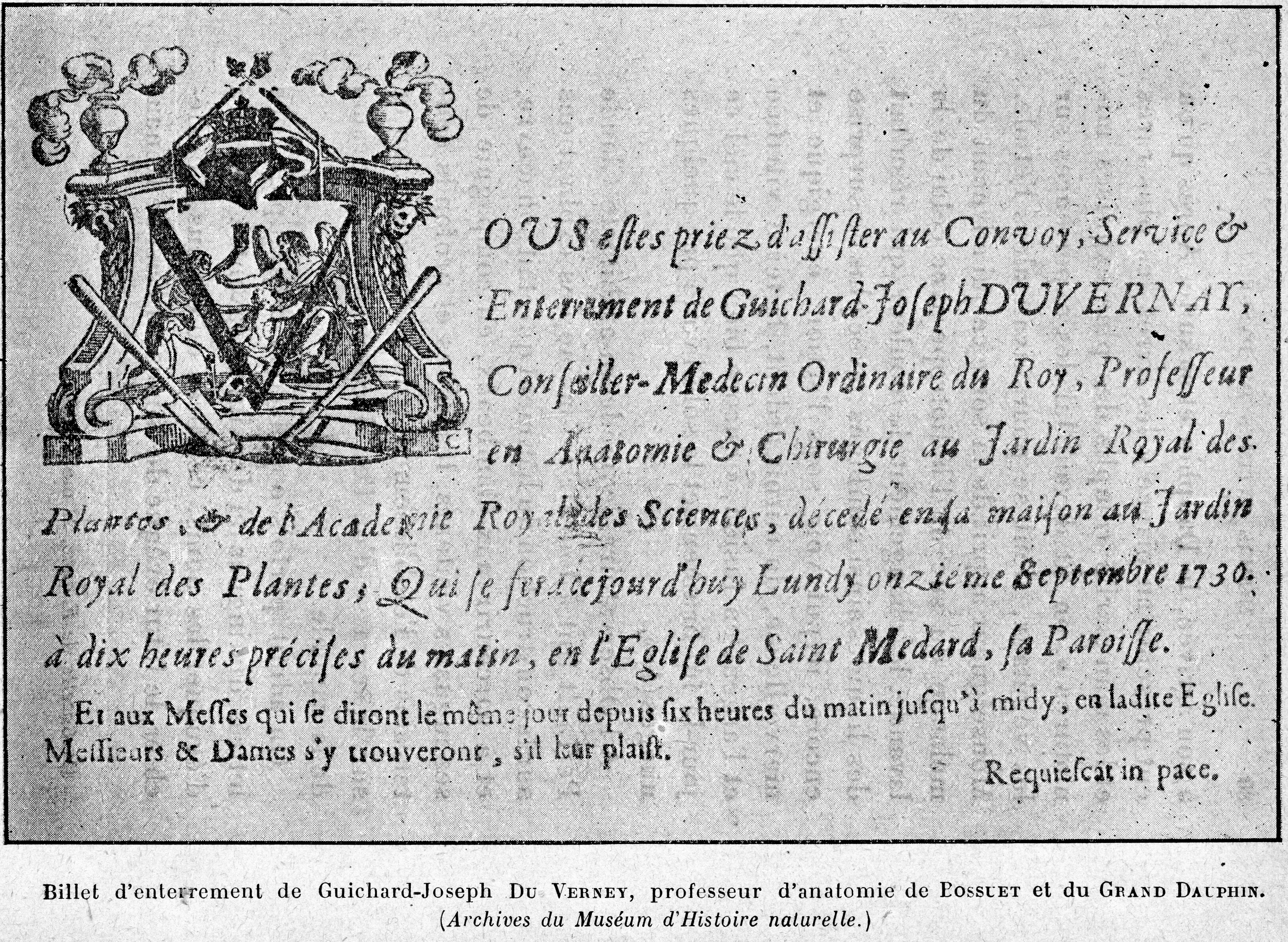
Funeral card of Guichard-Joseph Du Verney

Duverney published one of the earliest comprehensive works on otology (Paris, 1683): Traité de l'organe de l'ouie, contenant la structure, les usages et les maladies de toutes les parties de l'oreille (Treatise on the organ of hearing, containing the structure, function, and diseases of all parts of the ear). In the book he discusses the anatomy, physiology and diseases associated with the ear.

Duverney's theory of hearing (which he conceived with the help of physicist Edme Mariotte) was fundamentally similar to what physiologist Hermann von Helmholtz (1821–1894) later proposed in the mid-19th century, except that he thought that high frequency would resonate near the apex of the cochlea, and low frequencies near the base (Domenico Cotugno had to turn this around in 1760).

In 1683, Duverney identified a temporal bone tumor, which is believed to be the earliest description of cholesteatoma. He realized the importance of the Eustachian tube and its role in adjusting air pressure in the tympanic cavity. However, he believed that the Eustachian tube was always open, acting as a vent to the air, when the eardrum moves in and out.

Duverney's clinical work led to the posthumous publication of: Maladies des os ("Diseases of the bones"), a book containing a description of the eponymous "Duverney fracture" and the first full description of osteoporosis.

== Selection of works ==
- Myologie complete en couleur et grandeur naturelle, composée de l'Essai et de la Suite de l'Essai d'anatomie en tableaux imprimés (1746)
- Anatomie de la tête, en tableaux imprimés qui représentent au naturel le cerveau sous différentes coupes, la distribution des vaisseaux dans toutes les parties de la tête, les organes des sens et une partie de la névrologie, d'après les pièces disséquées et préparées par M. Duverney, en 8 grandes planches dessinées, peintes, gravées et imprimées en couleur et grandeur naturelle, par le sieur Gautier (1748) (Anatomy of the head)
- Abrégé d'anatomie, accommodé aux arts de peinture et de sculpture et mis dans un ordre nouveau dont la méthode est très facile et débarrassée de toutes les difficultés et les choses inutiles, qui ont toujours été un grand obstacle aux peintres […] (1765) (Short treatise of anatomy for painters and sculptors. With Roger de Piles and François Tortebat)
