= Duke of Coislin =

Duke of Coislin (Fr.: duc de Coislin) was a title of nobility in the peerage of France created by King Louis XIV in 1665 for Armand de Camboust.

== List of dukes of Coislin, 1665—1732 ==
From	To	Duke of Coislin	Relationship to predecessor
1665	1702	Armand de Camboust, duc de Coislin (1635–1702)	First Duke of Coislin
1702	1710	Pierre de Camboust, duc de Coislin (1655–1710)	Son of Armand de Camboust, duc de Coislin
1710	1732	Henri Charles du Cambout de Coislin (1665–1732)	Brother of Pierre de Camboust, duc de Coislin
