= Katharinenkirche, Oppenheim =

Church building in Oppenheim

Coordinates: 49°51′14″N 8°21′17″E

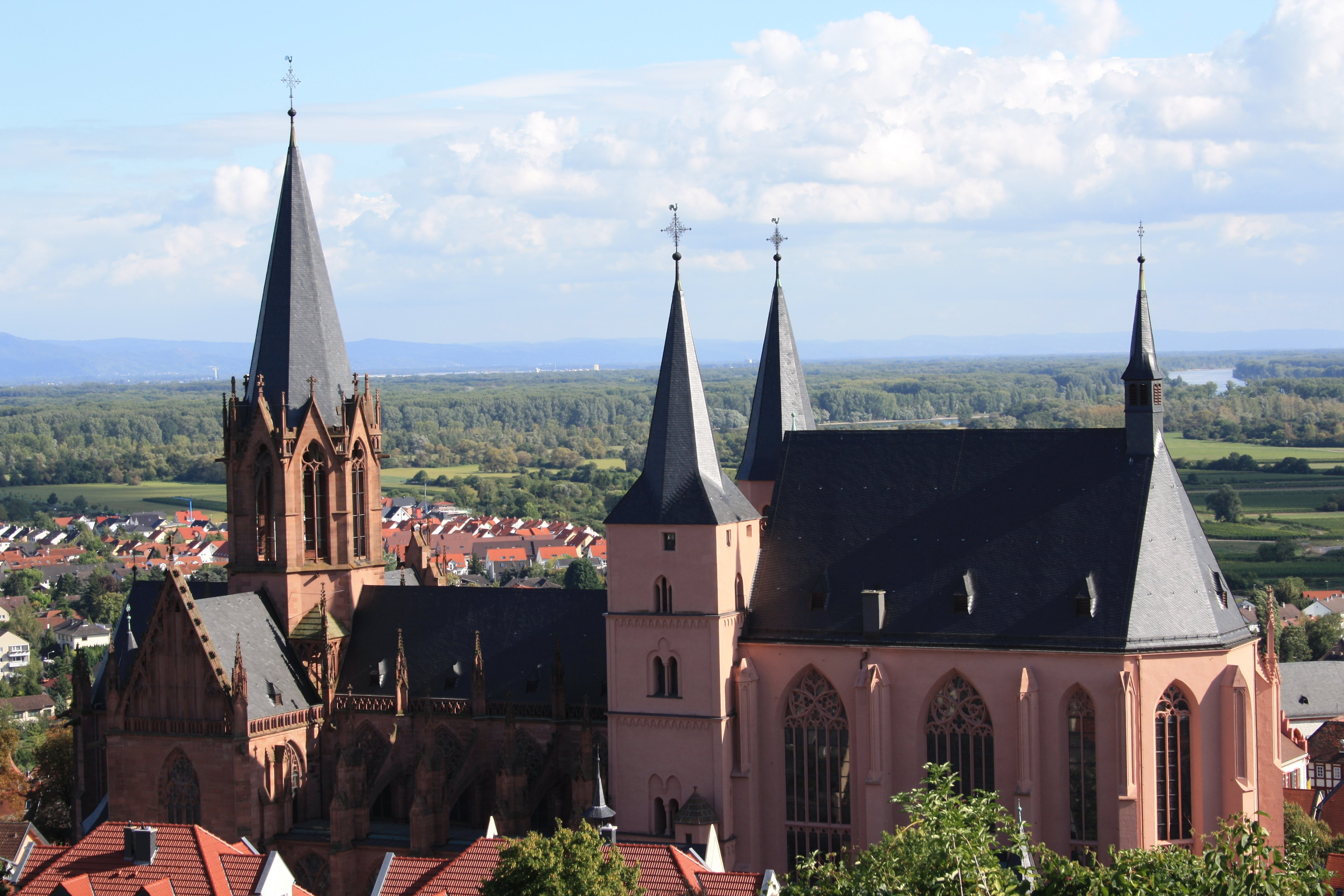
View from the vineyards in the west

The Katharinenkirche (St. Catherine's church) in Oppenheim, Germany, is regarded as an important Gothic church building on the Rhine, along with the cathedrals of Cologne and Strasbourg. Construction began probably in 1225, when Oppenheim was granted Town privileges. Since the merger of the Lutheran and Reformed congregation in 1822, it is a United Protestant church and its congregation forms part of the Protestant Church in Hesse and Nassau. The church is a venue of church music too. Church musicians are the organists Ralf and Katrin Bibiella.

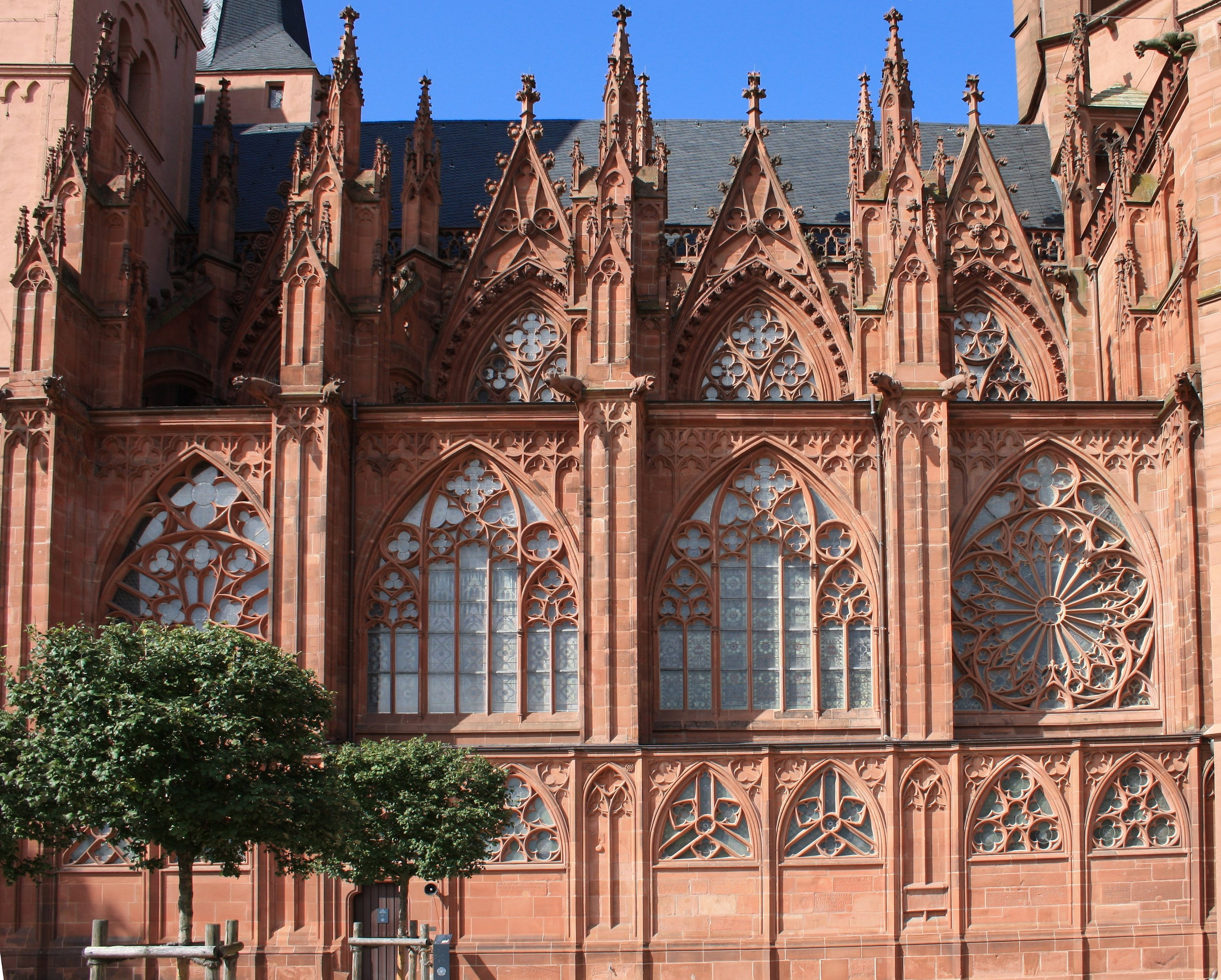
Windows from the South

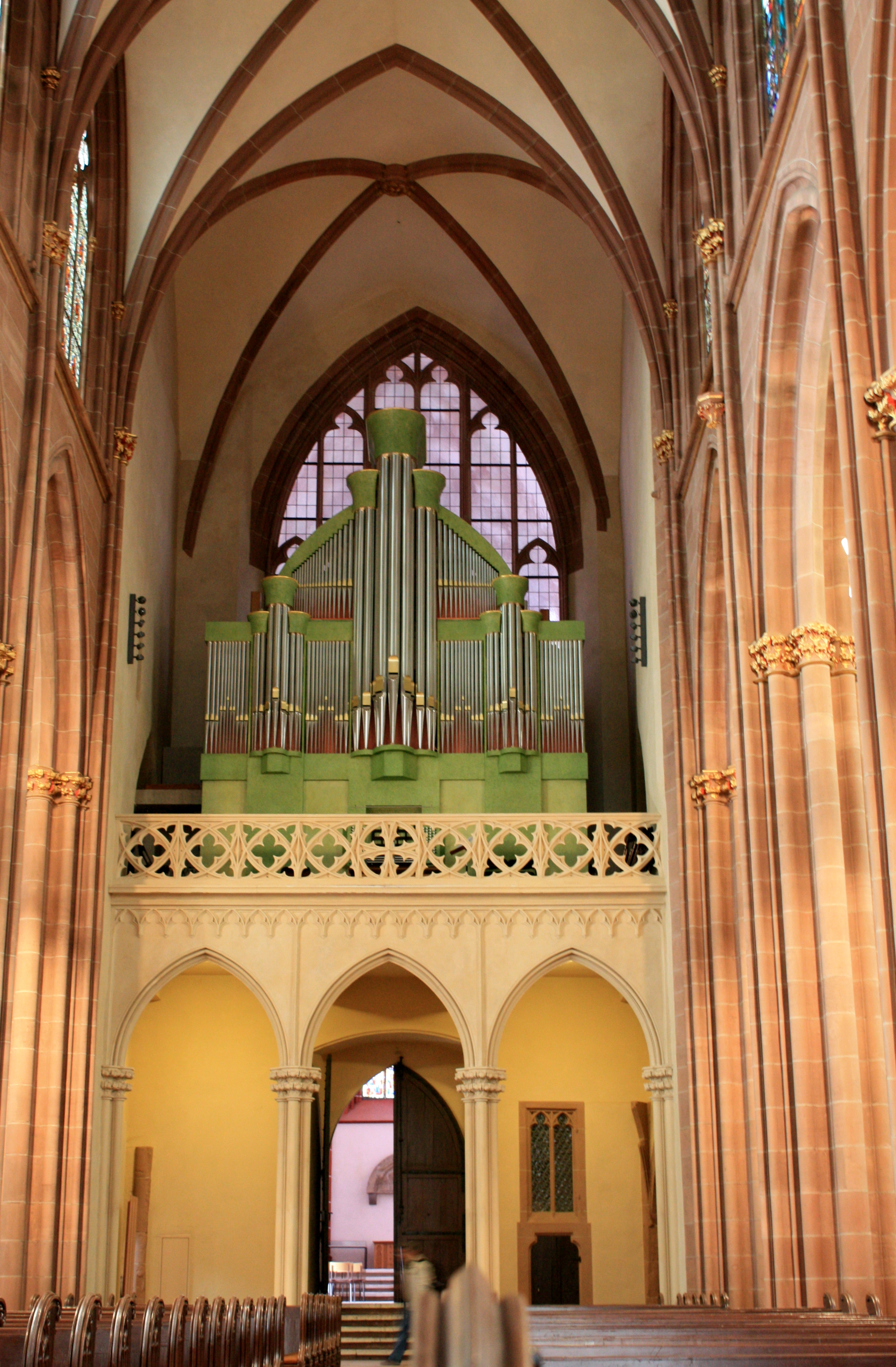
Organ

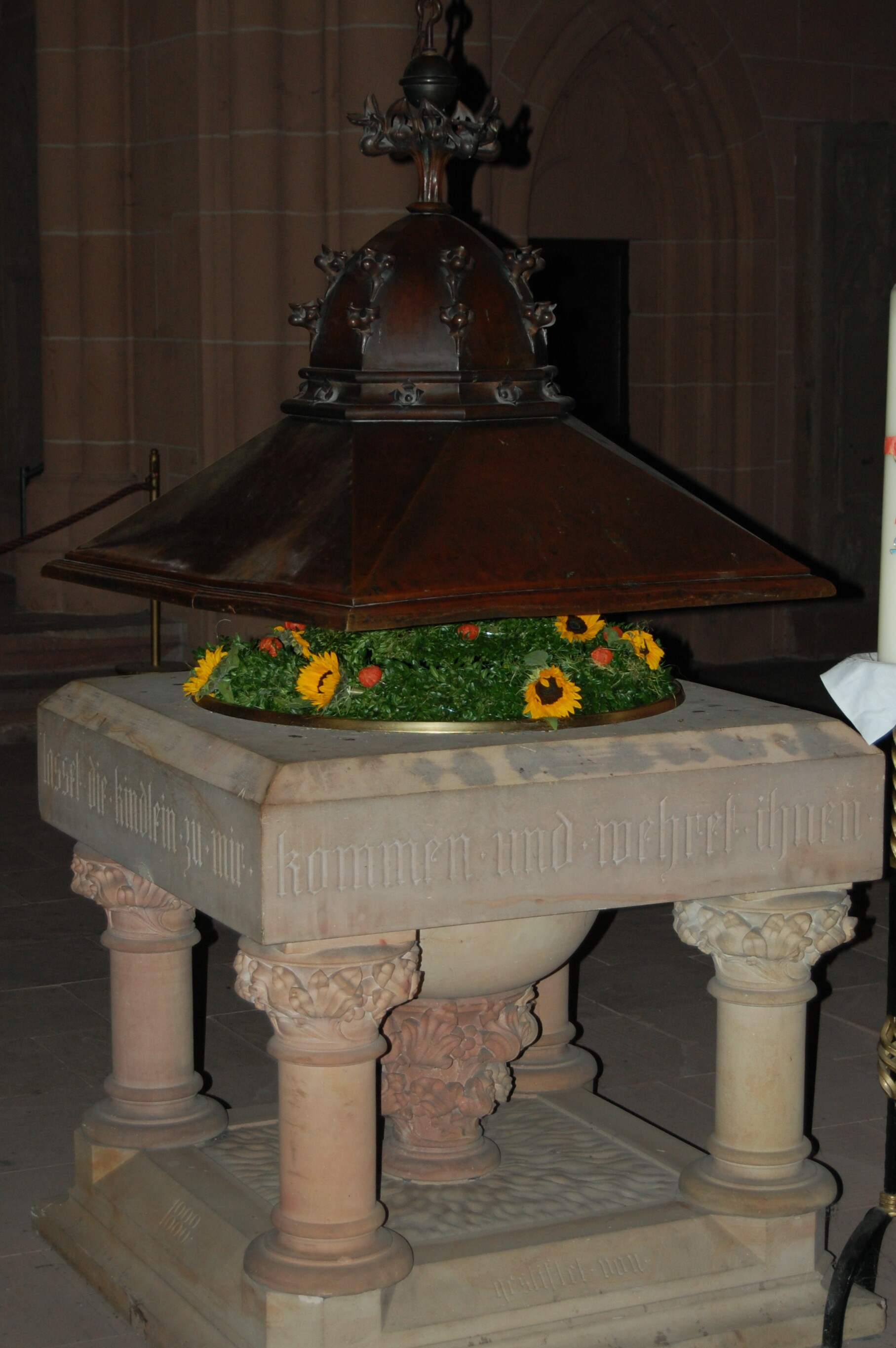
Baptismal font

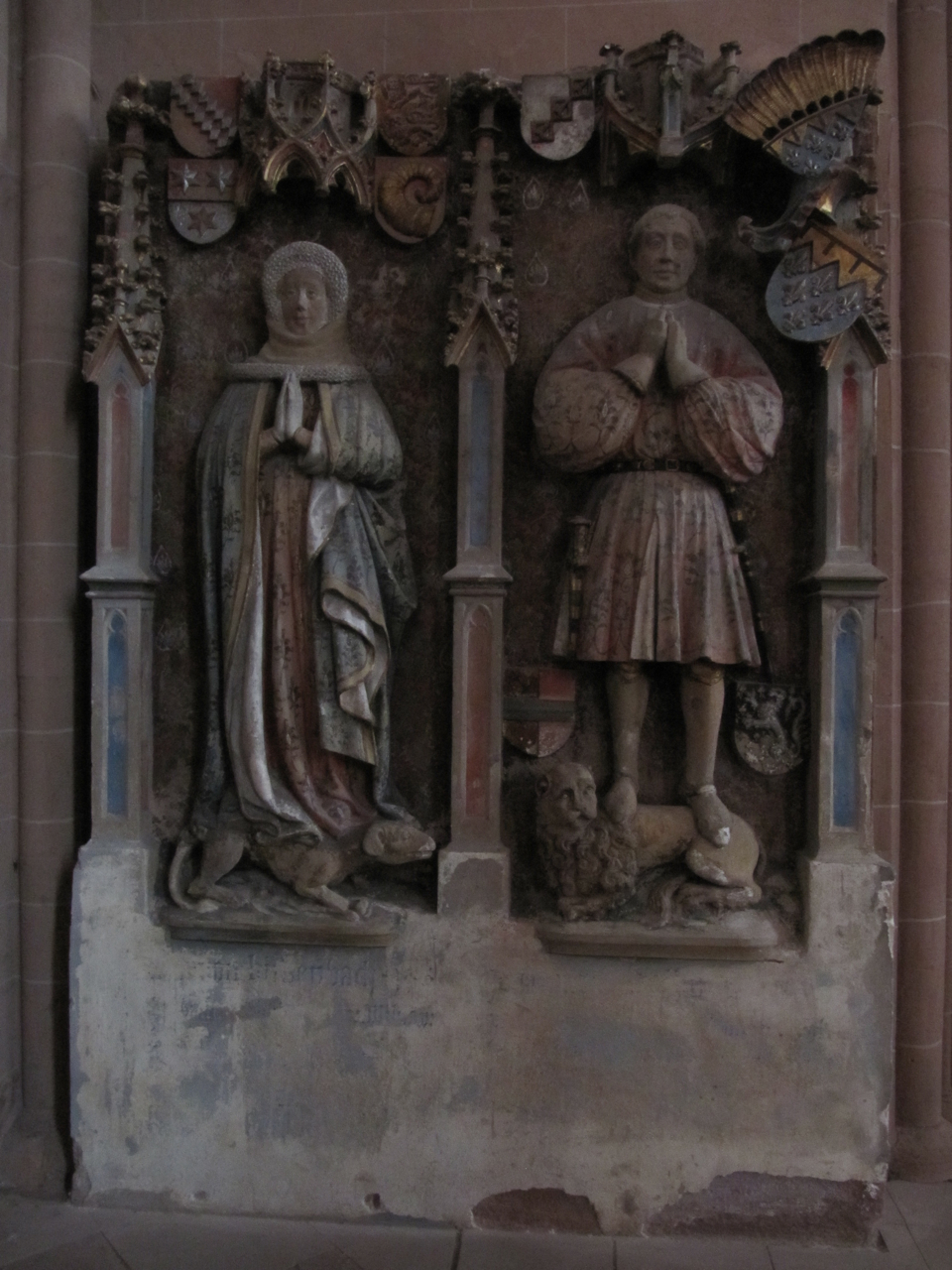
Grave of Anna von Dalberg

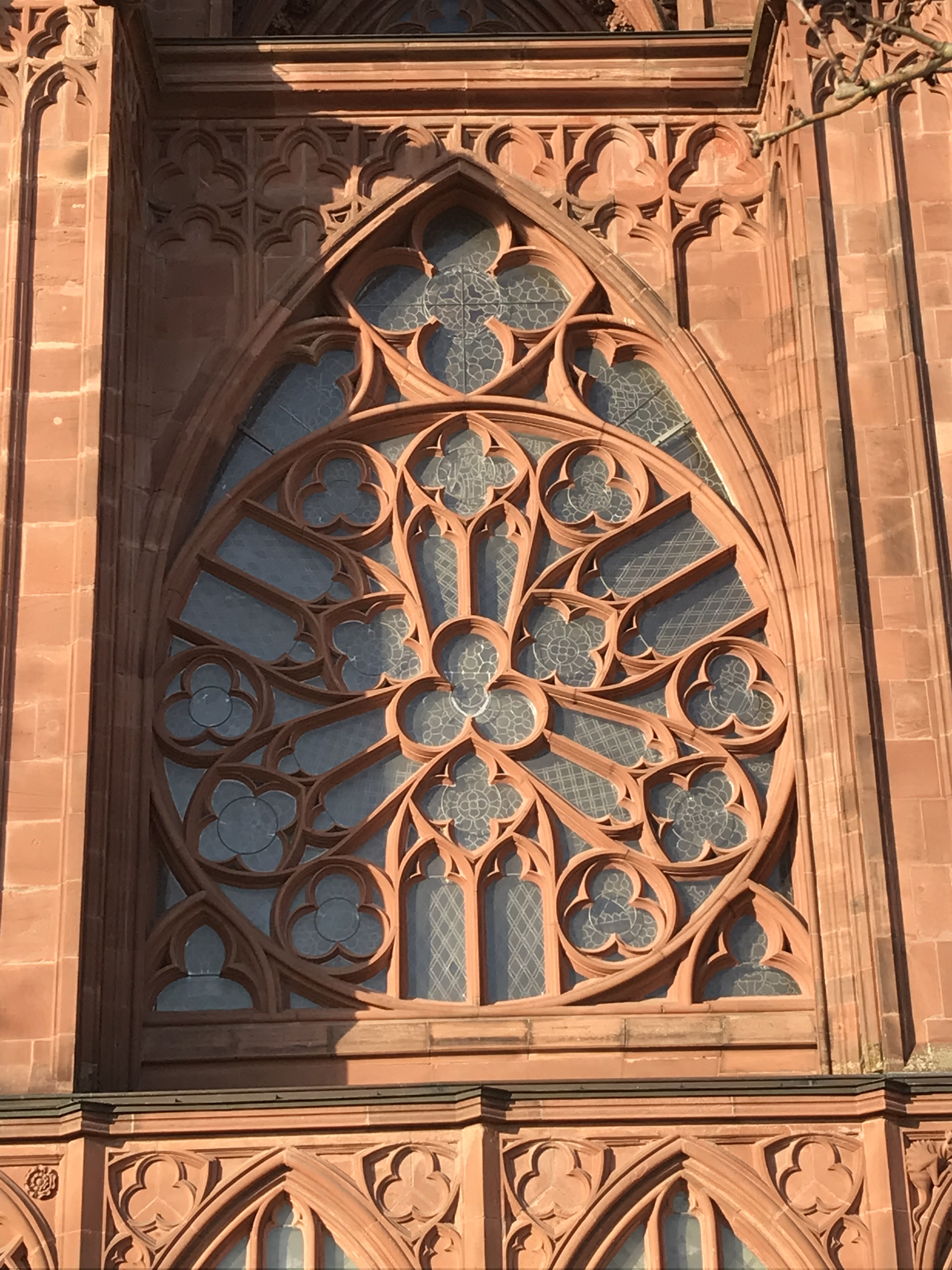
Katharinenkirche Oppenheim Lilienfenster

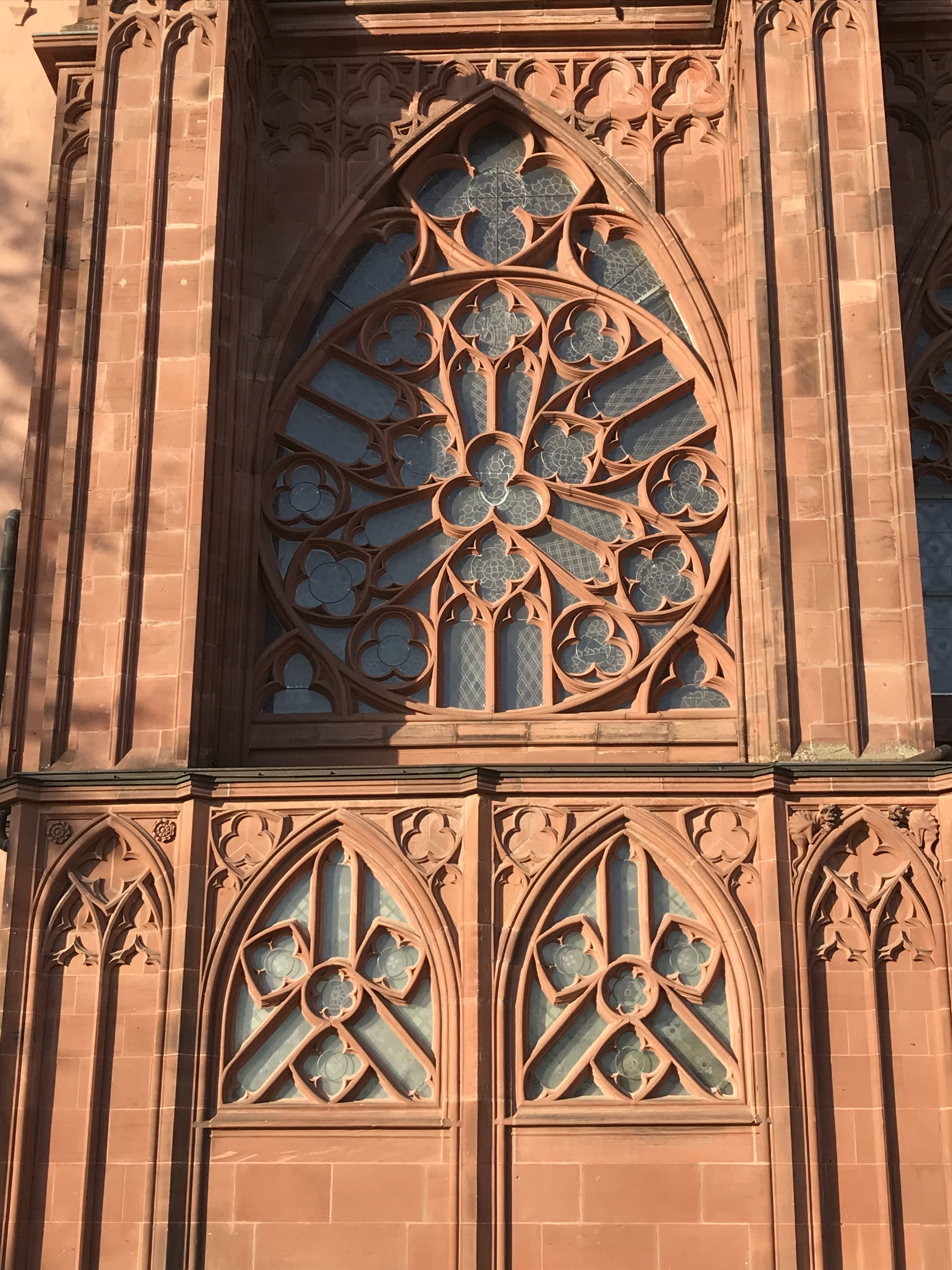

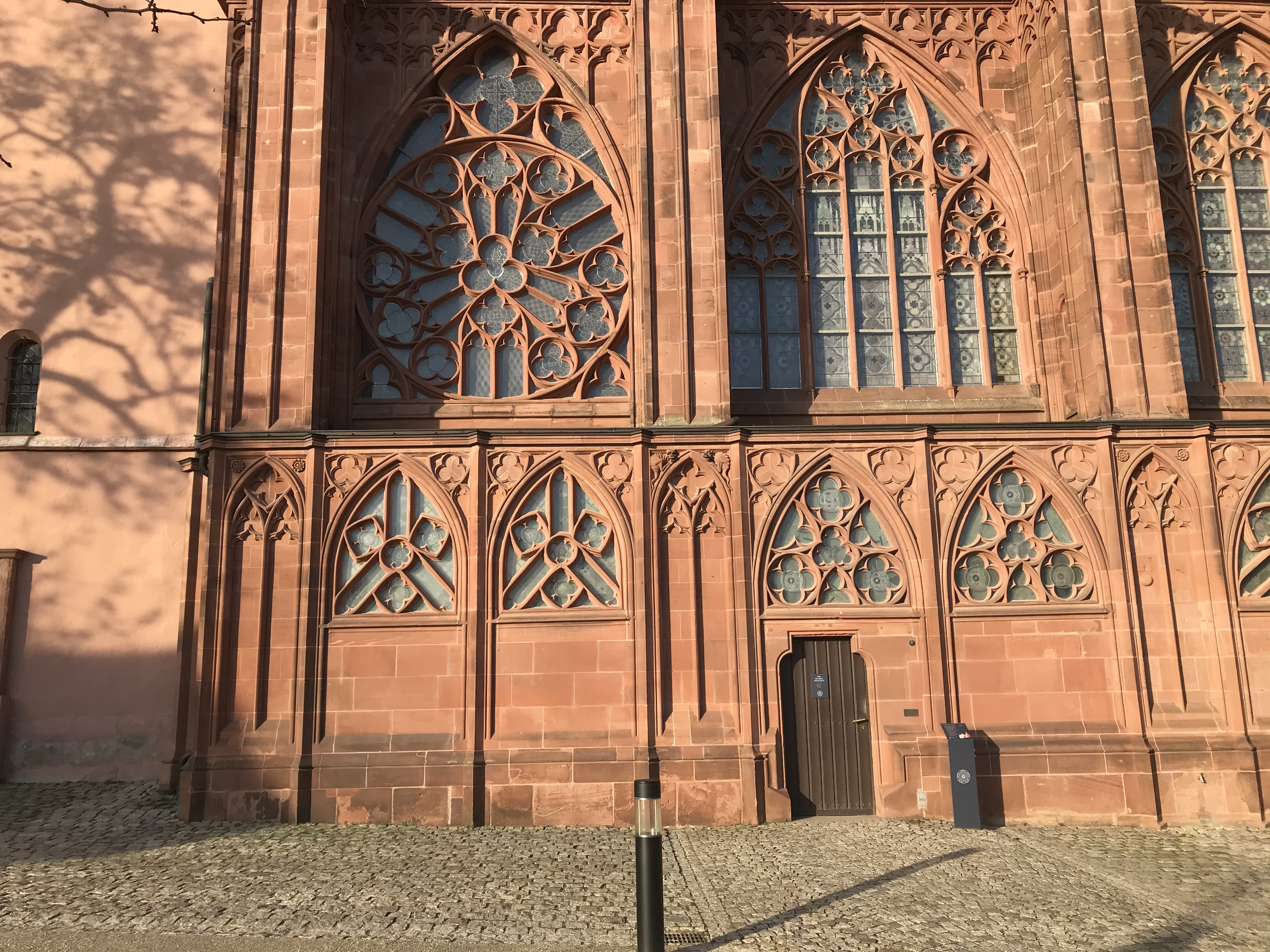
Katharinenkirche Oppenheim Suedfassade

== Literature ==
- Hildebrand Gurlitt: Baugeschichte der Katharinenkirche in Oppenheim a. Rh., Urban-Verlag, Freiburg i. Br. 1930, dissertation, Frankfurt University 1924)
- Georg Dehio: Handbuch der deutschen Kunstdenkmäler, Rheinland-Pfalz, Saarland, Deutscher Kunstverlag, München 1972, p. 686–691.
- Bernhard Schütz: Die Katharinenkirche in Oppenheim. de Gruyter, Berlin 1982, ISBN 3-11-008349-3.
- Ivo Rauch: Memoria und Macht. Die mittelalterlichen Glasmalereien der Oppenheimer Katharinenkirche und ihre Stifter. Gesellschaft für Mittelrheinische Kirchengeschichte, Mainz 1997, ISBN 3-929135-13-2.
