= Pierre du Cambout, 2nd Duke of Coislin =

French duke and peer

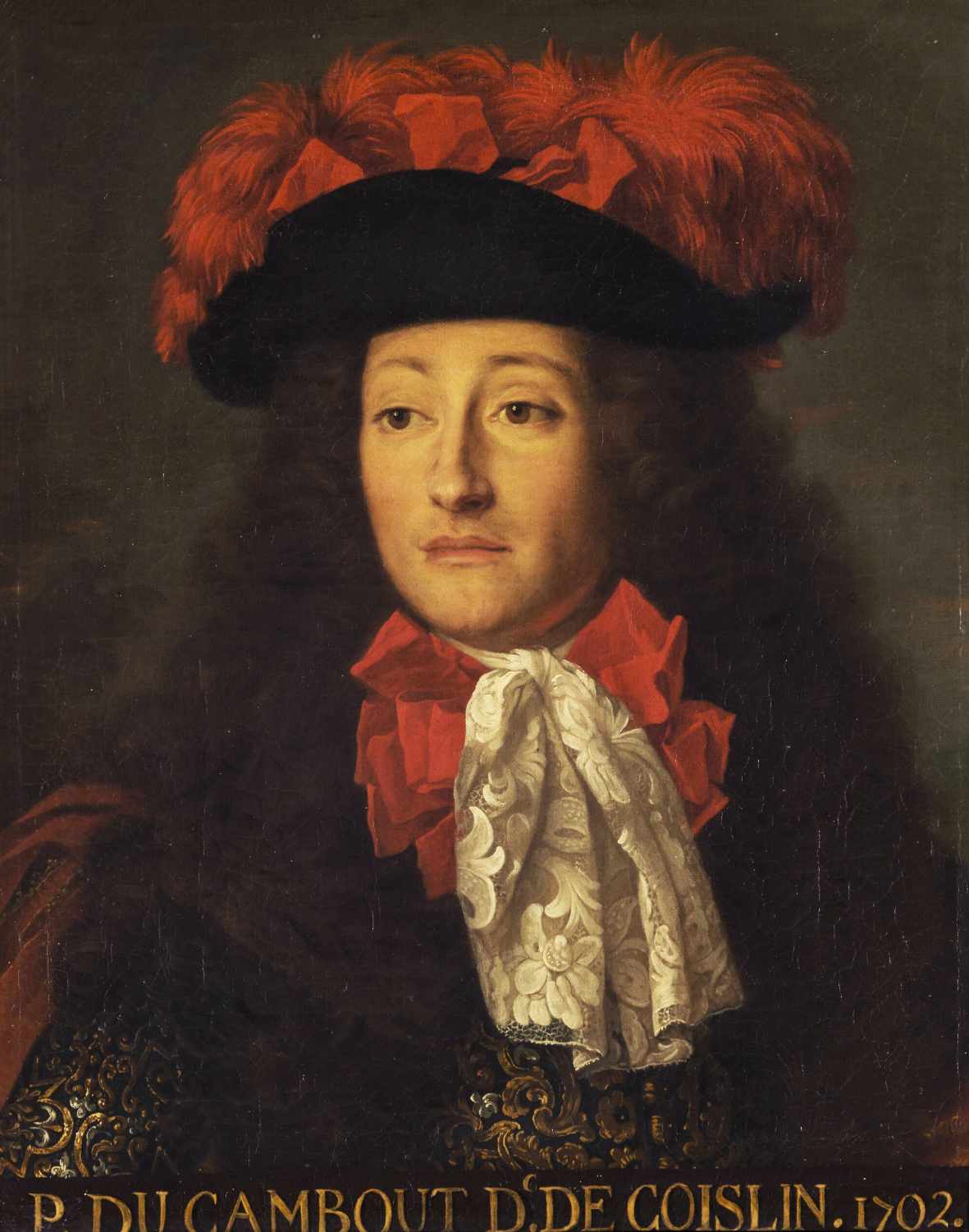
Image of Pierre du Cambout

Pierre du Cambout, 2nd Duke of Coislin (1664–1710) was a duke and peer of France, succeeding his father. He was admitted to the Académie française in his father's seat on 11 December 1702 by the Abbé de Dangeau.
