= Le Fossé =

- Part of Forges-les-Eaux
- Location of Le Fossé
- Location within France Location within Normandy
- Coordinates: 49°36′34″N 1°34′23″E
- Country: France
- Region: Normandy
- Department: Seine-Maritime
- Arrondissement: Dieppe
- Canton: Gournay-en-Bray
- Commune: Forges-les-Eaux
- Area^{1}: 10.11 km^{2} (3.90 sq mi)
- Elevation: 144 m (472 ft)
- Highest elevation: 227 m (745 ft)
- Lowest elevation: 138 m (453 ft)
- Population (2023): 482
  - Density: 47.7/km^{2} (123/sq mi)
- Time zone: UTC+01:00 (CET)
  - Summer (DST): UTC+02:00 (CEST)
- Postal code: 76440
- ^{1} French Land Register data, which excludes lakes, ponds, glaciers > 1 km^{2} (0.386 sq mi or 247 acres) and river estuaries.

Le Fossé is a former commune in the Seine-Maritime department in the Normandy region in northern France. On 1 January 2016, it was merged into the commune of Forges-les-Eaux.

== Geography ==
A farming and forestry village situated by the banks of the Epte river in the Pays de Bray, some 35 miles (56 km) southeast of Dieppe at the junction of the D9 and the D915 roads.

== Places of interest ==
- The church of St.Pierre & St.Paul, dating from the sixteenth century.

== See also ==
- Communes of the Seine-Maritime department
