= Pierre du Cambout =

French prelate

His Eminence Pierre du Cambout
- Bishop of Orléans; Grand Almoner of France
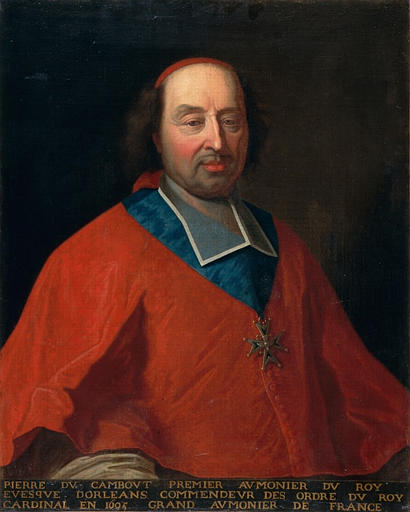
- Portrait of Cardinal Cambout, 1700
- Church: Catholic Church
- Diocese: Orléans
- Appointed: 29 March 1666
- Term ended: 5 February 1706
- Predecessor: Alphonse d’Elbène
- Successor: Louis-Gaston d’Armenonville
- Other posts: Cardinal-Priest of Trinità dei Monti (1700-1706)

Orders
- Consecration: 20 June 1666 by Hardouin de Péréfixe de Beaumont
- Created cardinal: 22 July 1697 by Pope Innocent XII
- Rank: Cardinal-Priest

Personal details
- Born: Pierre-Armand du Cambout de Coislin; 14 November 1636 Paris, France
- Died: 5 February 1706 (aged 69) Versailles, France
- Coat of arms

Pierre du Cambout (14 November 1636 – 5 February 1706) was a French prelate. He was a grandson of Pierre Séguier and held many important benefices - abbot of Jumièges, in 1641, of Saint-Victor, in 1643, canon of Paris, and first king's almoner in 1663. He was finally Grand Almoner of France and bishop of Orléans from 1665 to 1706, as well as (in a surprise appointment) being made cardinal priest of Trinità dei Monti.

Dangeau reported:

Cardinal Coislin went to court as little as he could, and was always in dispute with the king there, who even bit him sometimes; all the rest of his time he spent in his diocese, which he administered with great vigilance and by well-chosen means. He gave all the diocese's revenue [away] and made great handouts, though he always lived very honourably. Since his death, it has become known that he did major penances for many years, and that he only relaxed from them at night, when his household got undressed, to pray, and it was due to this that his last illness is attributed. Missionaries to the parish of Versailles came to him at his end and, with strange barbarism, no longer did they want to leave off approaching him as confessor; such was his domination of these people. The king wished the curé of Versailles to accompany [Pierre's] body to Orleans, an honour that has never been given to anyone since then, and of which his virtue was judged worthy. The whole diocese screamed, but these regrets were only the start of their sorrows.

Saint-Simon wrote of him:

this prelate was the object of a unique veneration. He was a man of average size, fat, short, a ruddy and unravelling face, an aquiline nose, handsome eyes with an air of candour, goodwill and virtue, who captivates all who see him and who touches even more those who know him [...] Of his diocese, that he took up when very young, he touched nothing and put his whole revenue into good works every year.

One of his successors removed the epitaph from the cardinal's tomb "since people were going there to pray to God, as at a saint's tomb". His nephew Henri Charles du Cambout de Coislin was also a bishop.

== Sources ==
- Micheline Cuénin, Un familier de Louis XIV. Le cardinal de Coislin, Grand aumônier de France, évêque d'Orléans, Orléans, 2007 (283 pages).
