= Étienne François Geoffroy =

French physician and chemist

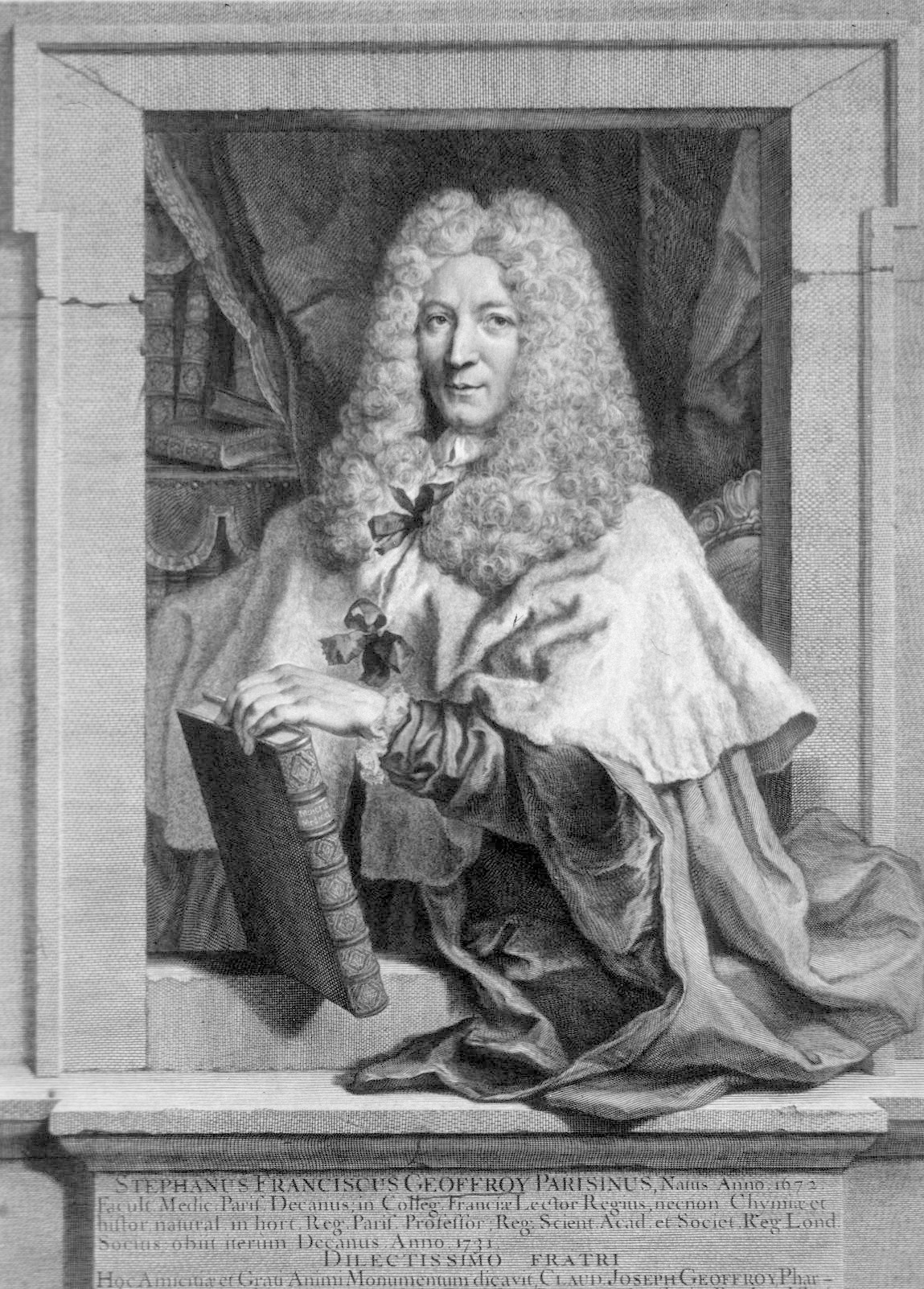
Étienne François Geoffroy

Étienne François Geoffroy (13 February 1672 – 6 January 1731) was a French physician and chemist, best known for his 1718 affinity tables. He first contemplated a career as an apothecary, but then decided to practice medicine. He is sometimes known as Geoffroy the Elder.

== Biography ==
Geoffroy was born in Paris. After studying at Montpellier he accompanied Marshal Tallard on his embassy to London in 1698 and thence travelled to the Netherlands and Italy. Returning to Paris he became professor of chemistry at the Jardin du Roi and of pharmacy and medicine at the Collège Royal, and dean of the faculty of medicine. He died in Paris on 6 January 1731.

His brother Claude Joseph, known as Geoffroy the younger, was also a chemist.

== Works ==
His name is best known in connection with his tables of "affinities" (tables des rapports), which he presented to the French Academy of Sciences in 1718 and 1720.

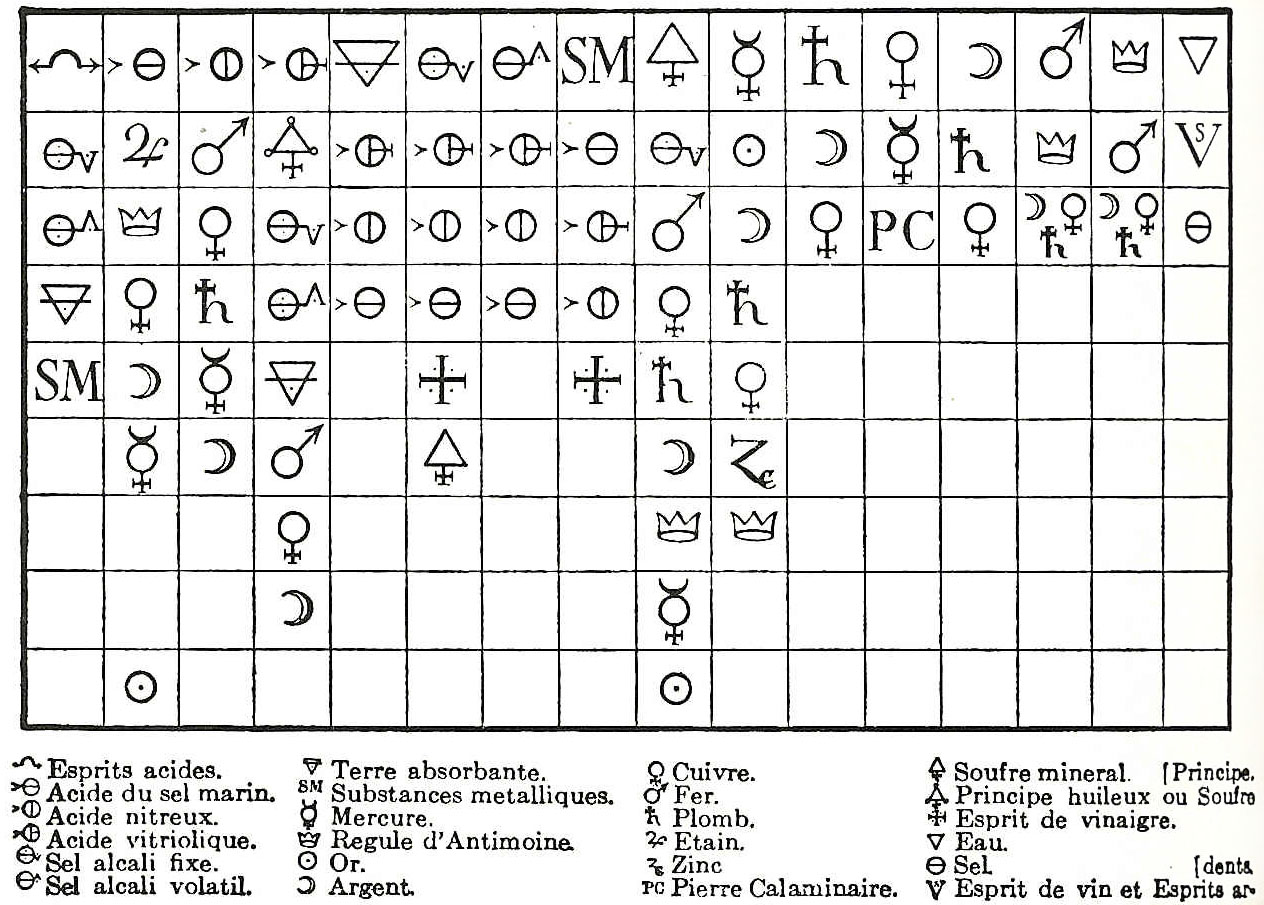
Geoffroy's Affinity Table (1718): At the head of the column is a substance with which all the substances below can combine.

These were lists, prepared by collating observations on the actions of substances one upon another, showing the varying degrees of affinity exhibited by analogous bodies for different reagents, and they retained their vogue for the rest of the century, until displaced by the profounder conceptions introduced by CL Berthollet.

Another of his papers dealt with the delusions of the philosopher's stone, but nevertheless he believed that iron could be artificially formed in the combustion of vegetable matter. His Tractatus de materia medico, published posthumously in 1741, was long celebrated.

== See also ==
- Chemical affinity
- Pharmacy
- Pharmacist
- The School of Pharmacy, University of London
