= HMS Beagle =

10-gun brig-sloop of the Royal Navy; notably carried Charles Darwin

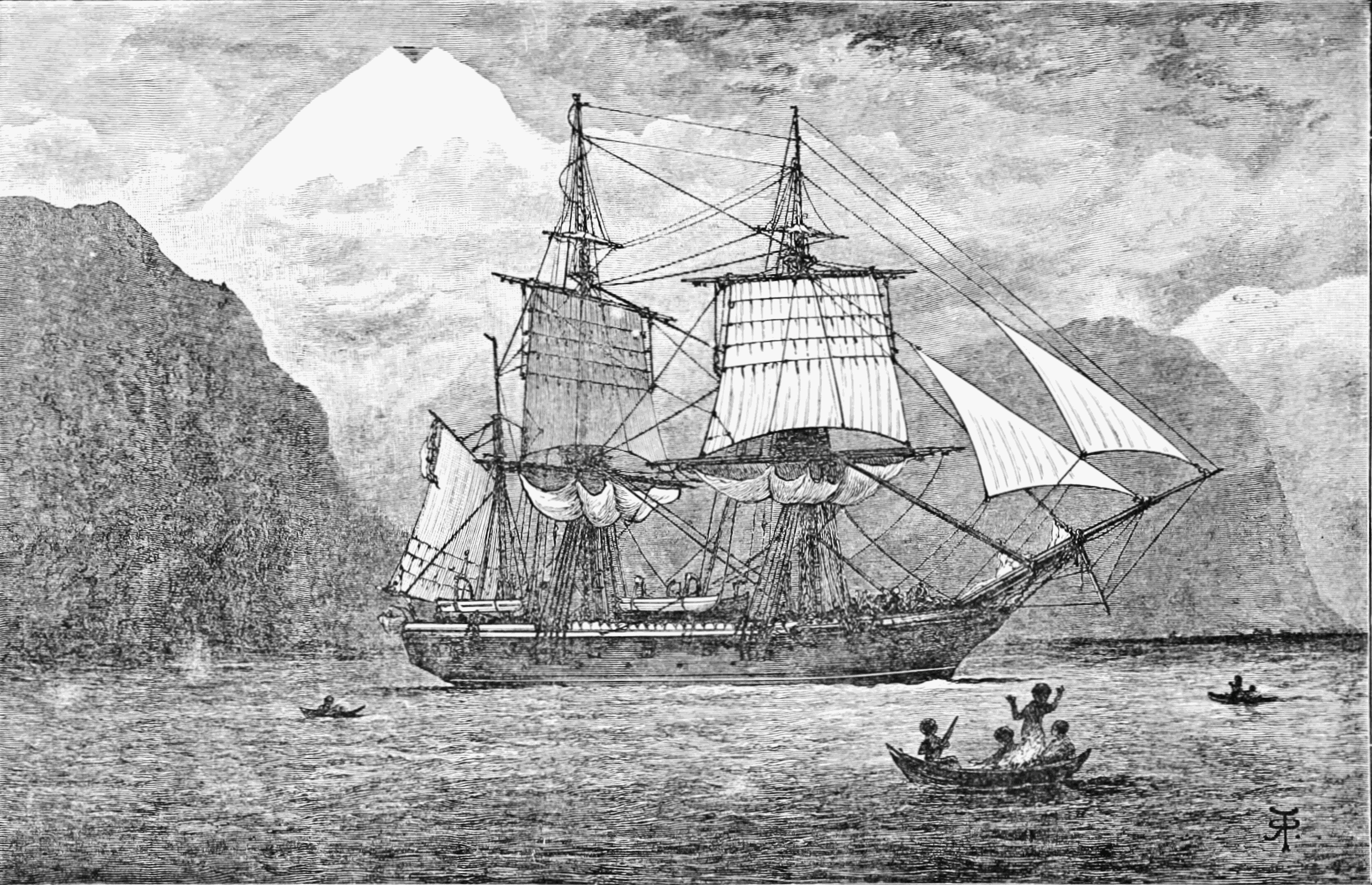
- HMS Beagle in the Straits of Magellan in front of the towering Monte Sarmiento, a reproduction of R. T. Pritchett's frontispiece from the 1890 illustrated edition of The Voyage of the Beagle

History

United Kingdom
- Ordered: 16 February 1817
- Cost: £7,803
- Laid down: June 1818
- Launched: 11 May 1820
- Commissioned: 1820
- Decommissioned: 1845, transferred to Coastguard
- Fate: Sold and broken up 1870; also possibly resting at Paglesham East End, Rochford Rural District, Essex (51°35′45″N 00°48′49″E)

General characteristics
- Class & type: Cherokee-class brig-sloop
- Tons burthen: 235 bm; 242 for second voyage
- Length: 90.3 ft (27.5 m)
- Beam: 24.5 ft (7.5 m)
- Draught: 12.5 ft (3.8 m)
- Sail plan: Brig (barque from 1825)
- Complement: 120 as a ship-of-war, 65 plus 9 supernumeraries on second voyage
- Armament: 10 guns, reduced to 6 guns for first survey voyage, changed to 7 guns during second survey voyage

HMS Beagle was a Cherokee-class 10-gun brig-sloop of the Royal Navy, one of more than 100 ships of this class. The vessel, constructed at a cost of £7,803, was launched on 11 May 1820 from the Woolwich Dockyard on the River Thames. Later reports say the ship took part in celebrations of the coronation of George IV, passing under the old London Bridge, and was the first rigged man-of-war afloat upriver of the bridge. There was no immediate need for Beagle, so she "lay in ordinary", moored afloat but without masts or rigging. She was then adapted as a survey barque and took part in three survey expeditions.

The second voyage of HMS Beagle is notable for carrying the recently graduated naturalist Charles Darwin around the world. While the survey work was carried out, Darwin travelled and researched geology, natural history and ethnology onshore. He gained fame by publishing his diary journal, best known as The Voyage of the Beagle, and his findings played a pivotal role in the formation of his scientific theories on evolution and natural selection.

== Design and construction ==
The Cherokee class of 10-gun brig-sloops was designed by Sir Henry Peake in 1807, and eventually over 100 were constructed. The working drawings for HMS Beagle and HMS Barracouta were issued to the Woolwich Dockyard on 16 February 1817, and amended in coloured ink on 16 July 1817 with modifications to increase the height of the bulwarks (the sides of the ship extended above the upper deck) by an amount varying from 6 inches (15 cm) at the stem to 4 inches (10 cm) at the stern. Beagle's keel was laid in June 1818, construction cost £7,803, and the ship was launched on 11 May 1820.

The first reported task of the ship was a part in celebrations of the coronation of King George IV; in his 1846 Journal, John Lort Stokes said that the ship was taken up the River Thames to salute the coronation, passing through the old London Bridge, and was the first rigged man-of-war afloat upriver of the bridge.

== First voyage (1826–1830) ==
Pringle Stokes was appointed captain of Beagle on 7 September 1825, and the ship was allocated to the surveying section of the Hydrographic Office. On 27 September 1825 The Beagle docked at Woolwich to be repaired and fitted out for her new duties. Her guns were reduced from ten cannons to six and a mizzen mast was added to improve her handling, thereby changing her from a brig to a bark (or barque).

The Beagle set sail from Plymouth on 22 May 1826 on her first voyage, under the command of Stokes. The mission was to accompany the larger ship HMS Adventure (380 tons) on a hydrographic survey of Patagonia and Tierra del Fuego, under the overall command of the Australian Captain Phillip Parker King, commander and surveyor.

On 3 March 1827, in the Barbara Channel, the Beagle encountered a boat with survivors of the sealer Prince of Saxe Coburg, which had wrecked in Cockburn Channel on 16 December 1826. Stokes sent two launches to rescue the other survivors who were encamped there.

Faced with the more difficult part of the survey in the desolate waters of Tierra del Fuego, Stokes fell into a deep depression. At Port Famine on the Strait of Magellan, he locked himself in his cabin for 14 days, then after getting over-excited and talking of preparing for the next cruise, shot himself on 2 August 1828. Following four days of delirium, Stokes recovered slightly, but then his condition deteriorated and he died on 12 August 1828. Captain Parker King then replaced Stokes with the First Lieutenant of Beagle, Lieutenant William George Skyring as commander, and both ships sailed to Montevideo. On 13 October, King sailed Adventure to Rio de Janeiro for refitting and provisions. During this work Rear Admiral Sir Robert Otway, commander in chief of the South American station, arrived aboard HMS Ganges and announced his decision that Beagle was also to be brought to Montevideo for repairs, and that he intended to supersede Skyring. When Beagle arrived, Otway put the ship under the command of his aide, Flag Lieutenant Robert FitzRoy.

The 23-year-old aristocrat FitzRoy proved an able commander and meticulous surveyor. In one incident a group of Fuegians stole a ship's boat, and FitzRoy took their families on board as hostages. Eventually, he held two men, a girl and a boy, who was given the name of Jemmy Button, and these four native Fuegians were taken back with them when Beagle returned to England on 14 October 1830. During their brief sojourn in England, Boat Memory, the most promising of the four, died of smallpox.

During this survey, the Beagle Channel was identified and named after the ship.

The log book from the first voyage, in Captain FitzRoy's handwriting, was acquired at auction at Sotheby's by the Museo Naval de la Nación (under the administration of the Argentine Navy) located in Tigre, Buenos Aires Province, Argentina, where it is now preserved.

== Second voyage (1831–1836) ==
FitzRoy had been given reason to hope that the South American Survey would be continued under his command, but when the Lords of the Admiralty appeared to abandon the plan, he made alternative arrangements to return the Fuegians. A kind uncle heard of this and contacted the Admiralty. Soon afterwards FitzRoy heard that he was to be appointed commander of HMS Chanticleer to go to Tierra del Fuego, but due to her poor condition Beagle was substituted for the voyage. FitzRoy was re-appointed as commander on 27 June 1831 and Beagle was commissioned on 4 July 1831 under his command, with Lieutenants John Clements Wickham and Bartholomew James Sulivan.

Beagle was immediately taken into dock at Devonport for extensive rebuilding and refitting. As she required a new deck, FitzRoy had the upper-deck raised considerably, by 8 inches (200 mm) aft and 12 inches (300 mm) forward. The Cherokee-class ships had the reputation of being "coffin" brigs, which handled badly and were prone to sinking. Apart from increasing headroom below, the raised deck made Beagle less liable to top-heaviness and possible capsize in heavy weather by reducing the volume of water that could collect on top of the upper deck, trapped aboard by the gunwales. Additional sheathing added to the hull added about seven tons to her burthen and perhaps fifteen to her displacement.

The ship was one of the first to be fitted with the lightning conductor invented by the English scientist William Snow Harris. FitzRoy spared no expense in her fitting out, which included 22 chronometers, and five examples of the Sympiesometer, a kind of mercury-free barometer patented by Alexander Adie which was favoured by FitzRoy as giving the accurate readings required by the Admiralty. To reduce magnetic interference with the navigational instruments, FitzRoy proposed replacing the iron guns with brass guns, but the Admiralty turned this request down. (When the ship reached Rio de Janeiro in April 1832, he used his own funds for replacements: the ship now had a "six-pound boat-carronade" on a turntable on the forecastle, two brass six-pound guns before the main-mast, and aft of it another four brass guns; two of these were nine-pound, and the other two six-pound.)

FitzRoy had found a need for expert advice on geology during the first voyage, and had resolved that if on a similar expedition, he would "endeavour to carry out a person qualified to examine the land; while the officers, and myself, would attend to hydrography." Command in that era could involve stress and loneliness, as shown by the suicide of Captain Stokes, and FitzRoy's own uncle Viscount Castlereagh had committed suicide under stress of overwork. His attempts to get a friend to accompany him fell through, and he asked his friend and superior Captain Francis Beaufort to seek a gentleman naturalist as a self-financing passenger who would give him company during the voyage. A sequence of inquiries led to Charles Darwin, a young gentleman on his way to becoming a rural clergyman, joining the voyage. FitzRoy was influenced by the physiognomy of Lavater, and Darwin recounted in his autobiography that he was nearly "rejected, on account of the shape of my nose! He was an ardent disciple of Lavater, & was convinced that he could judge a man's character by the outline of his features; & he doubted whether anyone with my nose could possess sufficient energy & determination for the voyage."

Beagle was originally scheduled to leave on 24 October 1831, but because of delays in her preparations the departure was delayed until December. Setting forth on what was to become a ground-breaking scientific expedition, she departed from Devonport on 10 December. Due to bad weather her first stop was just a few miles ahead, at Barn Pool, on the west side of Plymouth Sound. Beagle left anchorage from Barn Pool on 27 December, passing the nearby town of Plymouth. After completing extensive surveys in South America she returned via New Zealand, Sydney, Hobart Town (6 February 1836), to Falmouth, Cornwall, England, on 2 October 1836.

Darwin had kept a diary of his experiences, and combined this with details from his scientific notes as the book titled Journal and Remarks, published in 1839 as the third volume of the official account of the expedition. This travelogue and scientific journal was widely popular, and was reprinted many times with various titles and a revised second edition, becoming known as The Voyage of the Beagle. Darwin 1989, pp. 2–3, 24

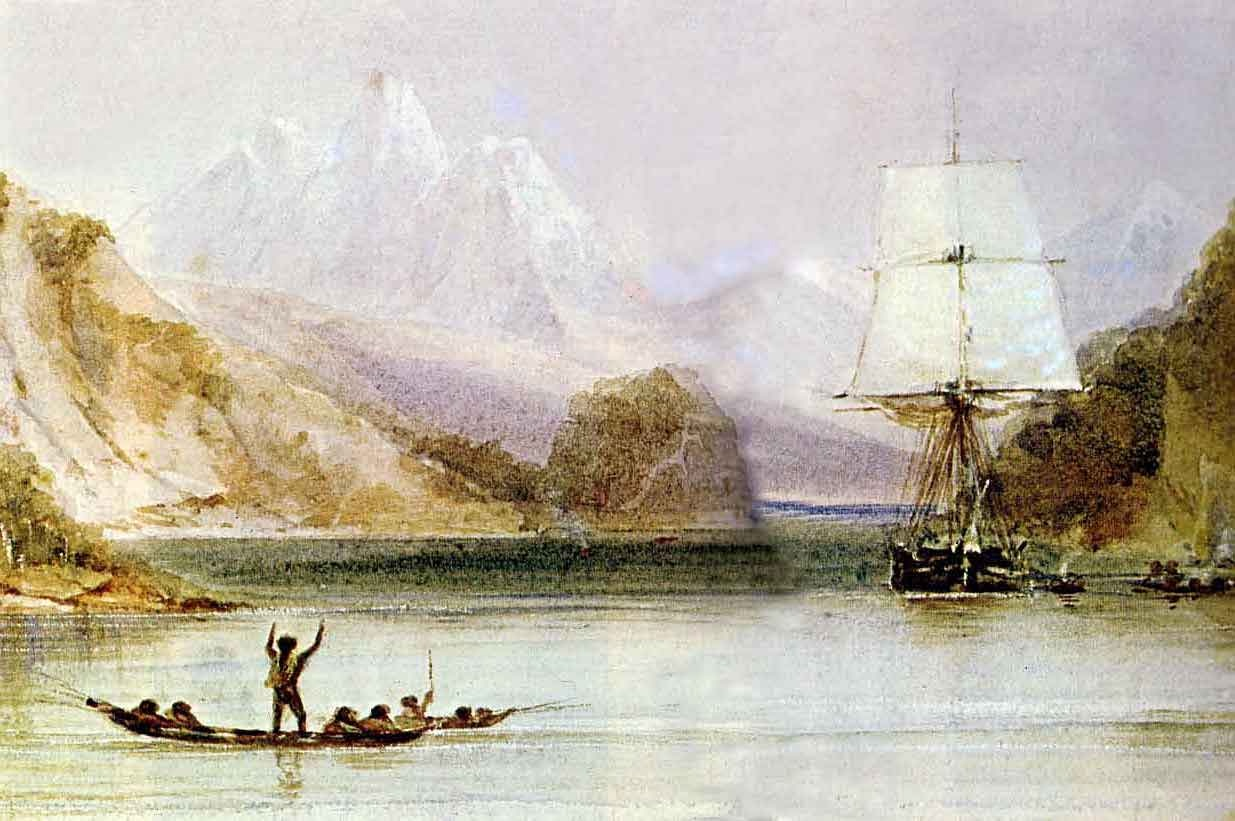
Beagle being hailed by native Fuegians during the survey of Tierra del Fuego, painted by Conrad Martens who became ship's artist in 1833

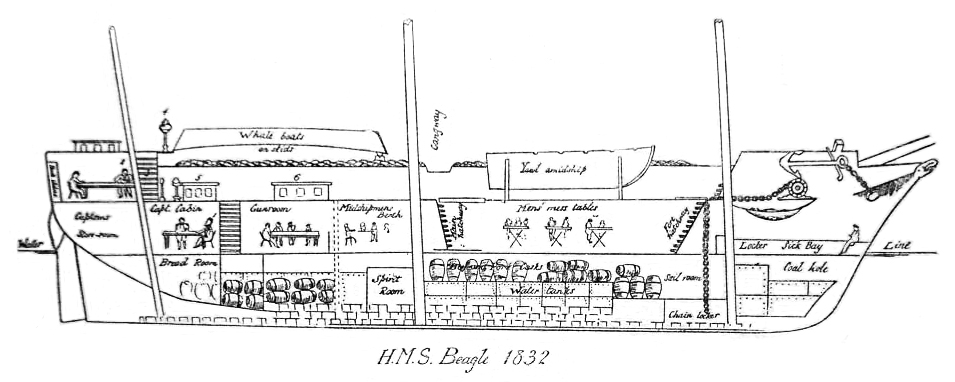
Longitudinal section of HMS Beagle as of 1832

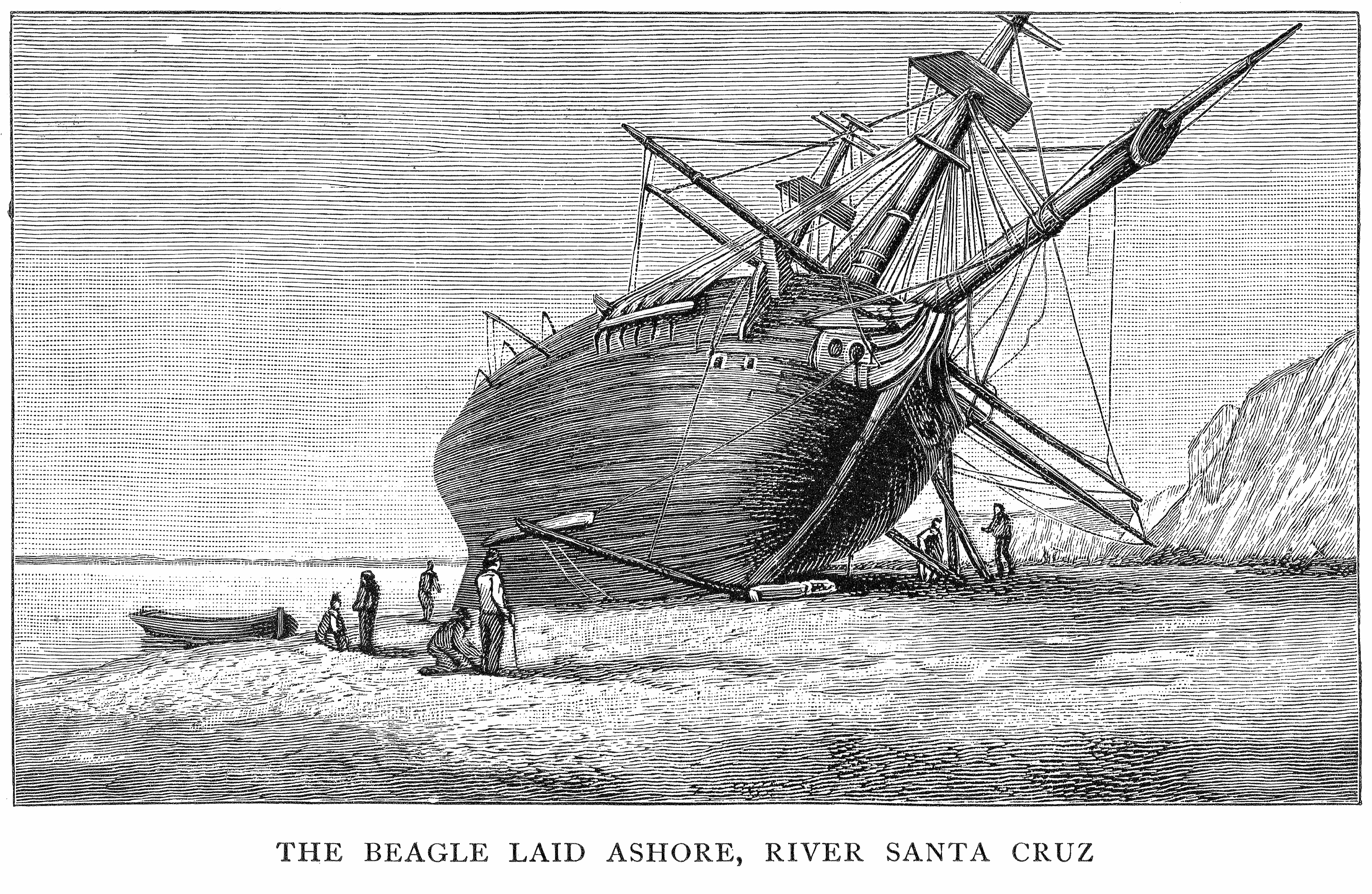
The Beagle Laid Ashore by the Santa Cruz river in Argentina, drawn by Conrad Martens (1834), and engraved by Thomas Landseer (1838)

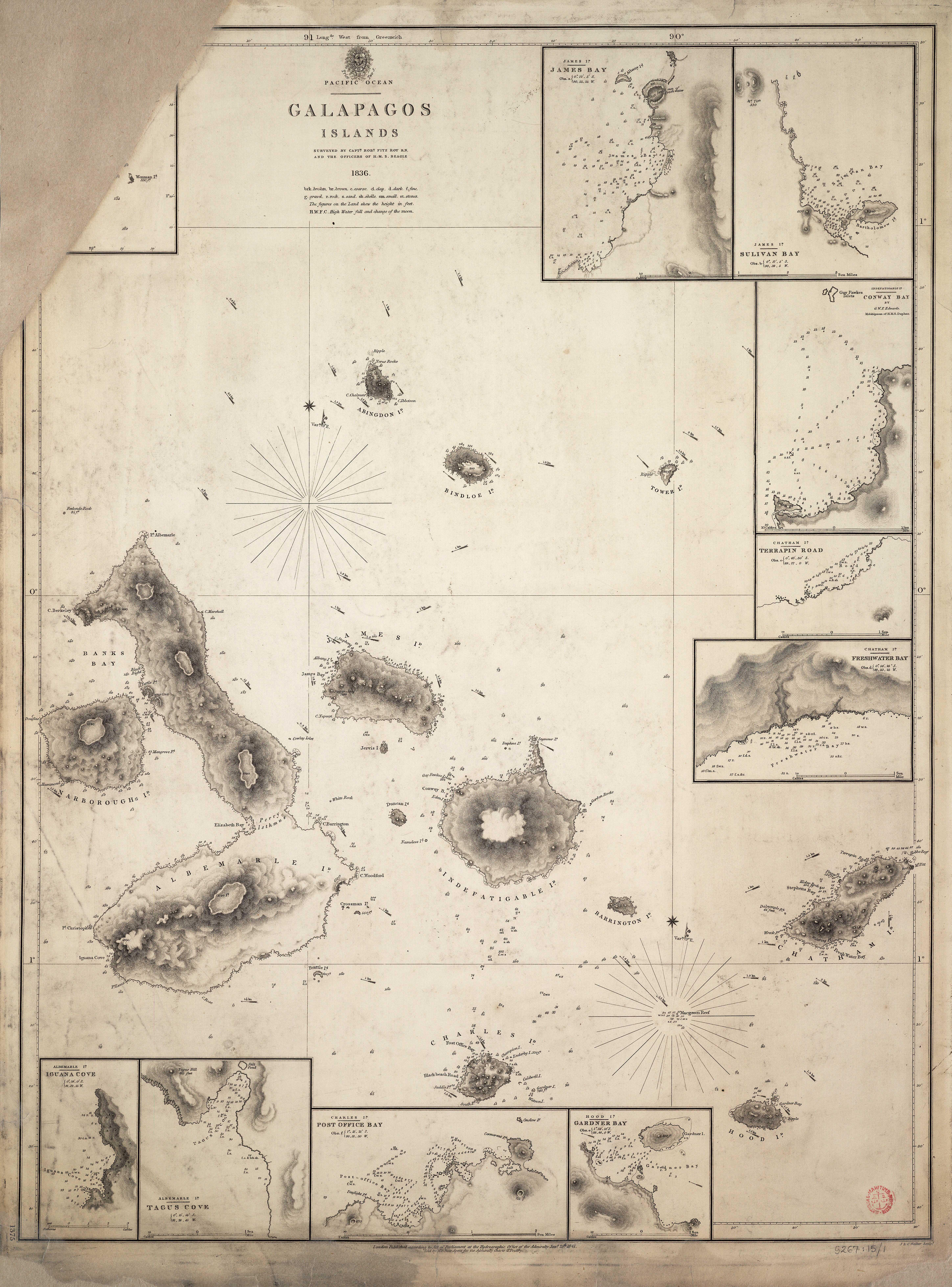
Admiralty Chart of the Galápagos Islands, one of the charts resulting from Fitzroy's hydrographic surveys

== Third voyage (1837–1843) ==
In the six months after returning from the second voyage, some light repairs were made and Beagle was commissioned to survey large parts of the coast of Australia under the command of Commander John Clements Wickham, who had been a lieutenant on the second voyage, with assistant surveyor Lieutenant John Lort Stokes (no relation to Pringle Stokes) who had been a midshipman on the first voyage of Beagle, then mate and assistant surveyor on the second voyage. They left Woolwich on 9 June 1837, towed by HM Steamer Boxer, and after reaching Plymouth spent the remainder of the month adjusting their instruments. They set off from Plymouth Sound on the morning of 5 July 1837, and sailed south with stops for observations at Tenerife, Bahia and Cape Town.

They reached the Swan River (modern Perth, Western Australia) on 15 November 1837. Their survey started with the western coast between there and the Fitzroy River, Western Australia, then surveyed both shores of the Bass Strait at the southeast corner of the continent. To aid Beagle in her surveying operations in Bass Strait, the Colonial cutter Vansittart, of Van Diemen's Land, was loaned by Sir John Franklin, Lieutenant-Governor of Van Diemen's Land, and placed under the command of Mr Charles Codrington Forsyth, the senior mate, assisted by Mr Pasco, another of her mates. In May 1839, they sailed north to survey the shores of the Arafura Sea opposite Timor. When Wickham fell ill and resigned, the command was taken over in March 1841 by Lieutenant John Lort Stokes who continued the survey. The third voyage was completed in 1843.

The exploration of the Gulf of Carpentaria revealed two major rivers, the Albert River and the Flinders River.

Numerous places around the coast were named by Wickham, and subsequently by Stokes when he became captain, often honouring eminent people or the members of the crew. On 9 October 1839 Wickham named Port Darwin, which was first sighted by Stokes, in honour of their former shipmate Charles Darwin. They were reminded of him (and his "geologising") by the discovery there of a new fine-grained sandstone. A settlement there became the town of Palmerston in 1869, and was renamed Darwin in 1911 (not to be confused with the present day city of Palmerston near Darwin).

During this survey, the Beagle Gulf was named after the ship.

Nicotiana benthamiana, a species of tobacco used from the 1990s as a platform for the production of recombinant pharmaceutical proteins, was first collected for scientific study on the north coast of Australia by Benjamin Bynoe during this voyage.

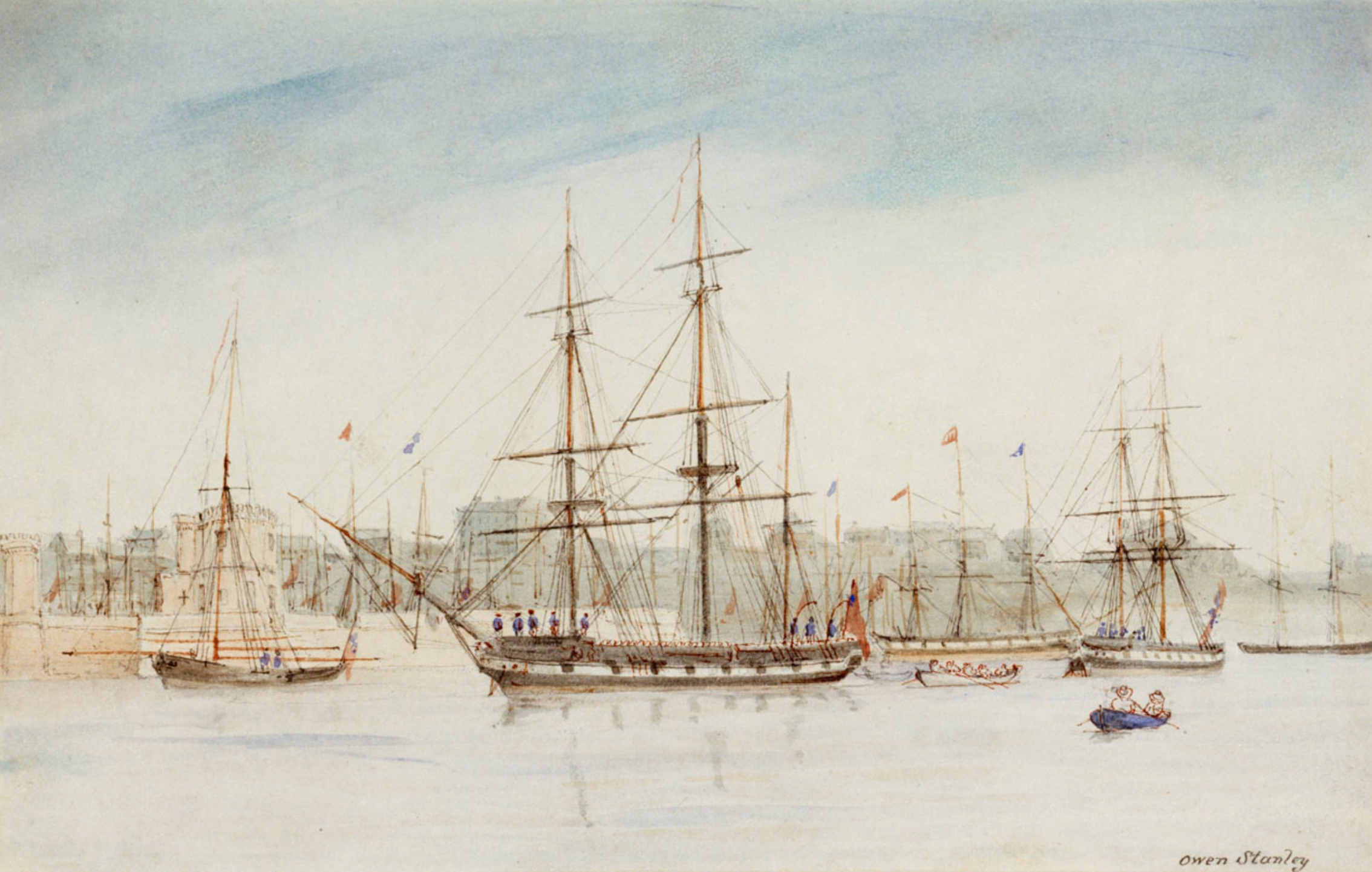
In 1837 HMS Beagle set off on a survey of Australia, and is shown here in an 1841 watercolour by Captain Owen Stanley of Beagle's sister ship HMS Britomart.

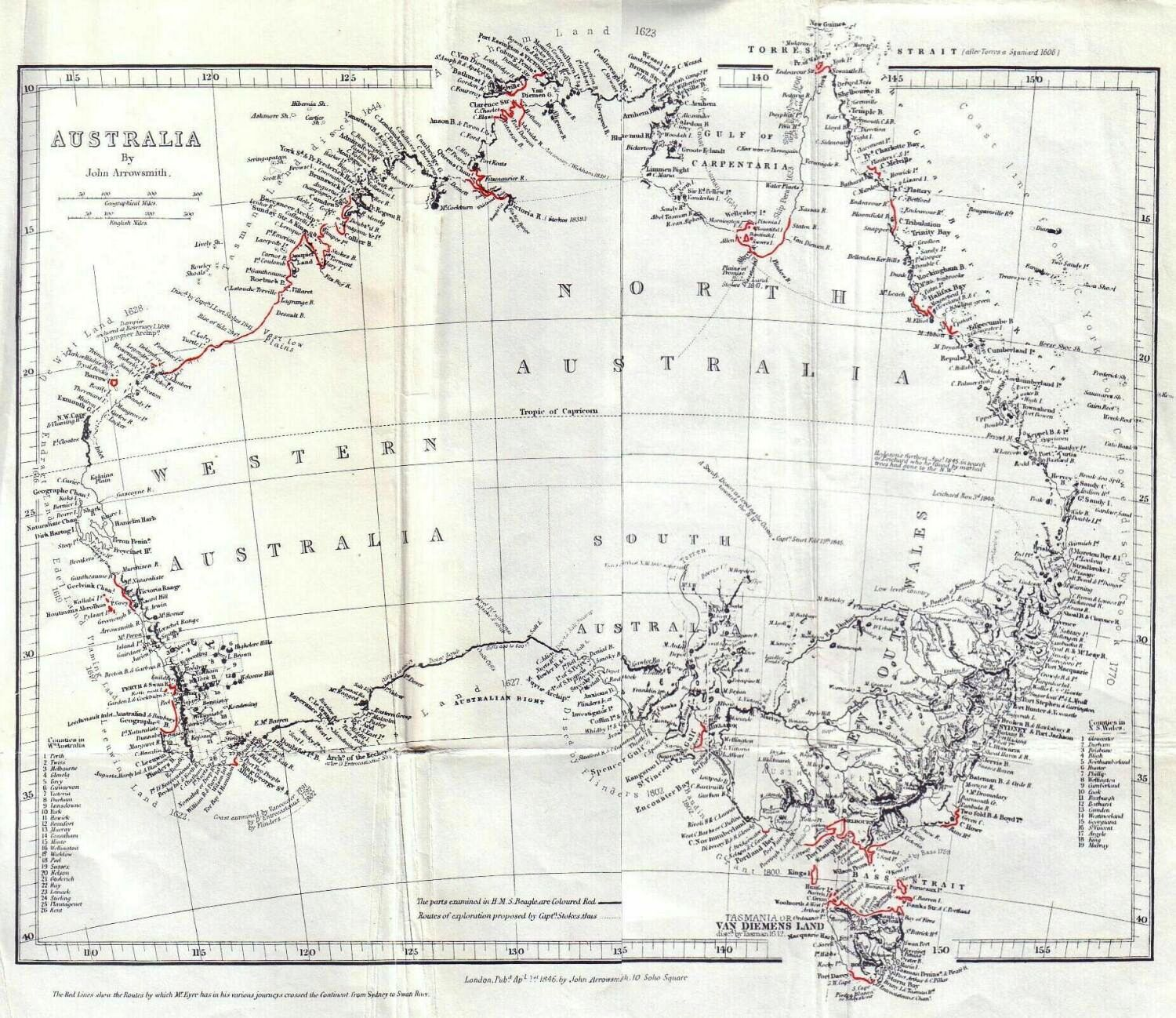
1846 "General Chart of Australia", showing coasts examined by HMS Beagle during the third voyage in red, from John Lort Stokes' Discoveries in Australia

== Final years ==
In 1845, Beagle was renamed WV-7 and was refitted as a static coastguard watch vessel like many similar watch ships stationed in rivers and harbours throughout the nation. She was transferred to HM Customs and Excise to control smuggling on the Essex coast in the navigable waterways beyond the north bank of the Thames Estuary. She was moored mid-river in the River Roach which forms part of an extensive maze of waterways and marshes known as The River Crouch and River Roach Tidal River System, located around and to the south and west of Burnham-on-Crouch. This large maritime area has a tidal coastline of 243 km (151 mi), part of Essex's 565 km (351 mi) of coastline – the largest coastline in the United Kingdom. In 1851, oyster companies and traders who cultivated and harvested the "Walflete" or "Walfleet" oyster (Ostrea edulis), petitioned for the Customs and Excise watch vessel WV-7 (ex HMS Beagle) to be removed as she was obstructing the river and its oyster-beds. In the 1851 Navy List dated 25 May, it showed her renamed "Southend W.V. No. 7 at Paglesham". In 1870, she was sold to "Messrs Murray and Trainer" to be broken up.

== Possible resting place ==
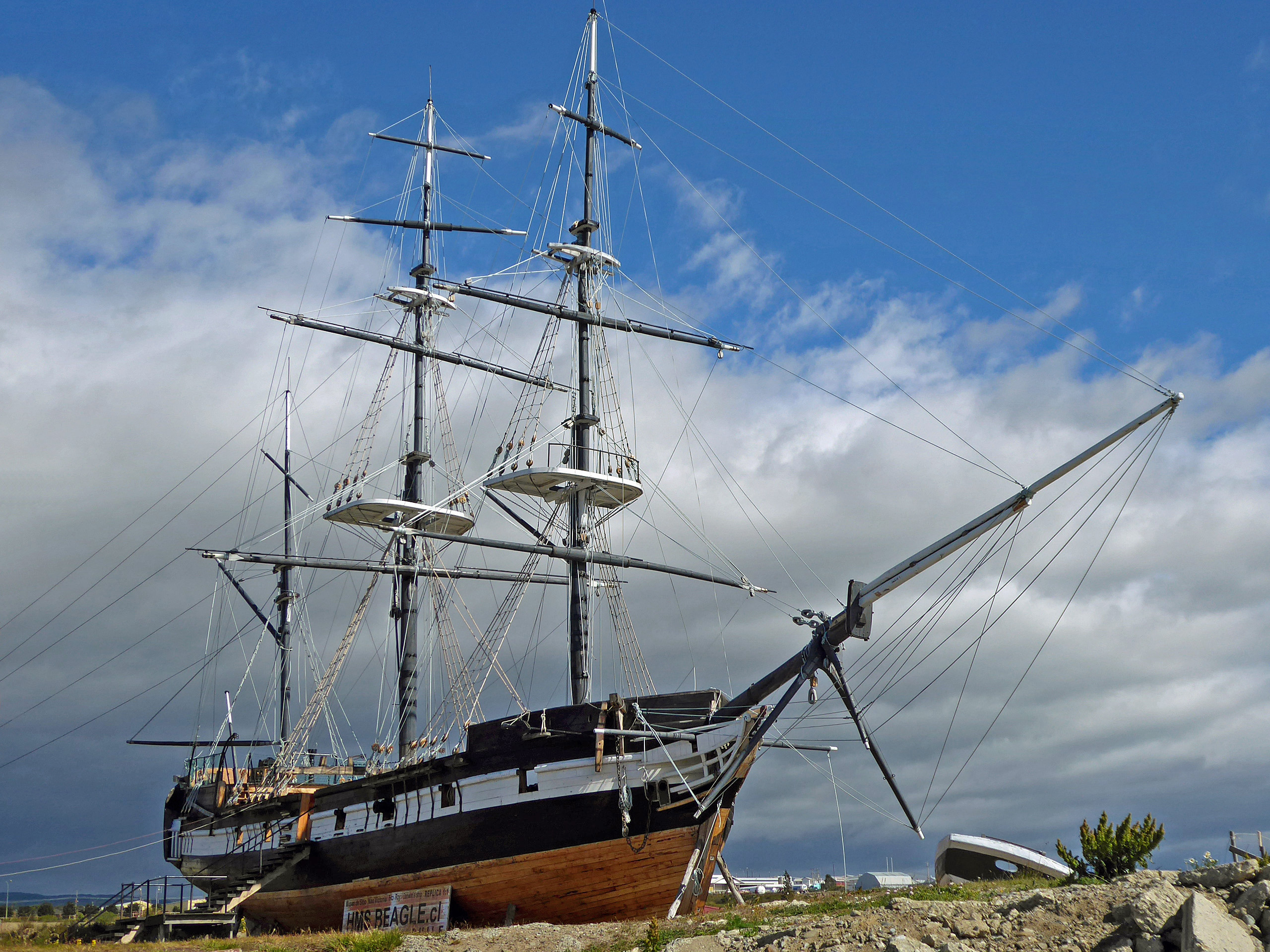
Replica scale 1:1 of HMS Beagle, Nao Victoria Museum, Punta Arenas, Chile, 2018

Investigations started in 2000 by a team led by Robert Prescott of the University of St Andrews found documents confirming that "W.V. 7" was Beagle, and noted a vessel matching her size shown midstream on the River Roach in Essex (in Paglesham Reach) on the 1847 hydrographic survey chart. A later chart showed a nearby indentation to the north bank of Paglesham Reach near the Eastend Wharf and near Waterside Farm. This could have been a dock for W.V. 7 – Beagle. Site investigations found an area of marshy ground some 15 ft (4.6 m) deep on the tidal river-bank, about 150 metres (490 ft) west of the boat-house. This discovery matched the chart position and many fragments of pottery of the correct period were found in the same area.

Surveys in November 2003 showed that there are the remains of substantial material within the dock that could be parts of the ship itself. An old anchor of 1841 pattern was excavated. It was also found that the 1871 census recorded a new farmhouse in the name of William Murray and Thomas Rainer, leading to speculation that they were the 1870 purchasers of the ship, "Messrs Murray and Trainer". The farmhouse was demolished in the 1940s, but a nearby boathouse incorporated timbers matching knee timbers used in Beagle. Two more large anchors similar to the one excavated from the ship's present location are known to have been found in neighbouring villages. It is believed that the ship carried four anchors.

Their investigations featured in a BBC television programme which showed how each watch ship would have accommodated seven coastguard officers, drawn from other areas to minimise collusion with the locals. Each officer had about three rooms to house his family, forming a small community. They would use small boats to intercept smugglers, and the investigators found a causeway giving access at low tide across the soft mud of the river bank. Apparently the next coastguard station along was Kangaroo, a sister ship

Research in 2025 has revealed that Messrs. Murray and Trainer bought two naval vessels at auction in London in May 1870. These were a paddle-steamer (HMS Advice) and HM Coastguard Watch vessel, HMS Beagle. One week later a newspaper advertisement appeared in the Shipping and Mercantile Gazette for tenders to tow a paddle-steamer from Devonport and a hulk from Pagelsham, both to the River Thames. Messrs Murray and Trainer had also bought a 600-ton iron-hulled ship which they were in the process of breaking up in January 1871, when they were prosecuted by Thames Conservancy for alleged pollution of the river. Their address was given as Crowley's Wharf, East Greenwich, and they were acquitted on the evidence of the Port of London Harbourmaster, who lived nearby and knew them. The case was heard in Greenwich Police Court and is reported in the Kentish Mercury of 11 February 1871, also recorded in the Thames Conservancy Minutes at London Docklands Museum.

It is clear that HMS Beagle ended her days at East Greenwich, broken up by experienced shipbreakers and not broken up in the Paglesham mud dock.

== See also ==
- Beagle 2 – A British Mars space probe, lost on 25 December 2003, named after HMS Beagle. It was photographed on the surface of Mars in 2015.
- European and American voyages of scientific exploration
- Museo Nao Victoria § HMS Beagle, a full-scale replica of the vessel completed in 2016
- Ship's chronometer from HMS Beagle
- The Voyage of the Space Beagle, a science fiction adventure novel by A. E. van Vogt loosely inspired by Darwin's voyage aboard HMS Beagle

== Sources ==
- Browne, E. Janet; Neve, Michael. Introduction. In Darwin (1989).
- Darwin, Charles (1839). Narrative of the surveying voyages of His Majesty's Ships Adventure and Beagle between the years 1826 and 1836, describing their examination of the southern shores of South America, and the Beagle's circumnavigation of the globe. Journal and remarks. 1832–1836. Vol. III. London: Henry Colburn.
- Darwin, Charles (1989). Voyage of the Beagle: Charles Darwin's Journal of researches. London: Penguin Books. ISBN 978-0-14-043268-8.. Abridged version of Darwin's Journal and Remarks.
- Desmond, Adrian; Moore, James (1991). Darwin. London: Michael Joseph, Penguin Group. ISBN 978-0-7181-3430-3.
- FitzRoy, Robert (1836). "Sketch of the Surveying Voyages of his Majesty's Ships Adventure and Beagle, 1825–1836. Commanded by Captains P. P. King, P. Stokes, and R. Fitz-Roy, Royal Navy. (Communicated by John Barrow)". Journal of the Geological Society of London. 6: 311–343.
- FitzRoy, Robert (1839). Narrative of the surveying voyages of His Majesty's Ships Adventure and Beagle between the years 1826 and 1836, describing their examination of the southern shores of South America, and the Beagle's circumnavigation of the globe. Proceedings of the second expedition, 1831–36, under the command of Captain Robert Fitz-Roy, R.N. Vol. II. London: Henry Colburn.
- FitzRoy, Robert (1839a). Narrative of the surveying voyages of His Majesty's Ships Adventure and Beagle between the years 1826 and 1836, describing their examination of the southern shores of South America, and the Beagle's circumnavigation of the globe. Appendix to Volume II. Vol. IIa. London: Henry Colburn.
- King, P. P. (1839). FitzRoy, Robert (ed.). Narrative of the surveying voyages of His Majesty's Ships Adventure and Beagle between the years 1826 and 1836, describing their examination of the southern shores of South America, and the Beagle's circumnavigation of the globe. Proceedings of the first expedition, 1826–30, under the command of Captain P. Parker King, R.N., F.R.S. Vol. I. London: Henry Colburn.
- Marquardt, Karl, HMS Beagle: Survey Ship Extraordinary Conway Maritime Press, 2010. ISBN 9780851777030
- Stokes, John Lort (1846). Discoveries in Australia. London: T. and W. Boone., Volume 1, Volume 2
- Taylor, James (2008). "1: The Origin & Design of HMS Beagle". Voyage of the Beagle: Darwin's Extraordinary Adventure in Fitzroy's Famous Survey Ship. Conway Publishing, Anova Books. ISBN 978-1-84486-066-1.
