= 1818 in science =

The year 1818 in science and technology involved some significant events, listed below.

== Astronomy ==
- January 3 (21:52 UTC) – Venus occults Jupiter, last occultation of one planet by another before 22 November 2065.

== Chemistry ==
- Pierre Joseph Pelletier and Joseph Bienaimé Caventou isolate the alkaloid strychnine in Paris.
- Louis Jacques Thénard discovers hydrogen peroxide.

== Exploration ==
- John Ross sets sail in search of the Northwest Passage.

== Medicine ==
- September 25 – In London, Dr James Blundell carries out the first blood transfusion using human blood.
- In London, the East India Company enters into an agreement by which those of its servants certified insane in India might be cared for in a private lunatic asylum, Pembroke House in Hackney, run at this time by Dr George Rees, an early example of enlightened corporate provision in the history of psychiatric care.
- Jean Esquirol produces reports urging greater medicalization in the treatment of insanity in France.
- Carl Ferdinand von Graefe publishes his pioneering work on rhinoplasty, Rhinoplastik.

== Meteorology ==
- Luke Howard begins publication of The Climate of London, the first book on urban climatology in English, presenting new thinking on atmospheric electricity and the causes of precipitation.
- Alexander Adie patents the sympiesometer.

== Physics ==
- July 29 – French physicist Augustin-Jean Fresnel submits his prizewinning "Memoir on the Diffraction of Light" to the French Academy of Sciences, precisely accounting for the limited extent to which light spreads into shadows, and thereby demolishing the oldest objection to the wave theory of light.

== Technology ==
- January 2 – Institution of Civil Engineers inaugurated in London.
- January 12 – The Dandy horse (Laufmaschine bicycle) is invented by Karl Drais in Mannheim.
- February 3 – Jeremiah Chubb is granted a patent for the Chubb detector lock.
- April 6 – Heinrich Stölzel and Friedrich Blühmel patent the first brass instrument valve.
- December – Denis Johnson of London patents his "pedestrian curricle", a form of dandy horse.
- Shipbuilder Thomas Morton of Leith, Scotland, invents the patent slip.
- Rev. Robert Stirling builds the first practical version of his Stirling engine.
- Adam Ramage files a United States patent for an improved printing press.

== Publications ==
- Benjamin Silliman begins publishing the American Journal of Science, concentrating on geology; by the 21st century it will be the longest-running scientific journal issued in the United States.

== Awards ==
- Copley Medal: Robert Seppings

== Births ==
- April 8 – August Wilhelm von Hofmann (died 1892), German chemist.
- May 1 – Lyon Playfair (died 1898), Scottish chemist.
- June 29 – Angelo Secchi (died 1878), Italian astronomer.
- July 1 – Ignaz Semmelweis (died 1865), Hungarian physician.
- August 1 – Maria Mitchell (died 1889), American astronomer.
- September 27 – Hermann Kolbe (died 1884), German chemist.
- December 24 – James Prescott Joule (died 1889), English physicist.

== Deaths ==
- July 28 – Gaspard Monge (born 1746), French mathematician.
- August 11 – Ivan Petrovich Kulibin (born 1735), Russian inventor.
- Bryan Higgins (born 1741), Irish-born chemist.
- William Jones (born c. 1745), English lepidopterist.
