= Shipwright (disambiguation) =

A shipwright is a person in the trade of yacht and/or shipbuilding.

Shipwright may also refer to:

- Shipwright (annual), publication for model-makers
- Denis Shipwright (1898–1984), British Royal Air Force officer

== See also ==
- The Shipwright's Company, livery company a.k.a. Worshipful Company of Shipwrights
- Shipwright's Arms Hotel, Australian former pub
