= List of shipwrecks in December 1826 =

The list of shipwrecks in December 1826 includes some ships sunk, foundered, grounded, or otherwise lost during December 1826.

== 1 December ==
List of shipwrecks: 1 December 1826
Ship	State	Description
Bartley	United Kingdom	The ship was driven ashore in Sheephaven Bay. She was on a voyage from Riga, Russia to Londonderry.
Blucher	United Kingdom	The ship struck the Rear Sand, in the English Channel and was consequently beached at New Romney, Kent. She later floated off and attempted to put into Folkestone, Kent, where she lost her bowsprit against the pier. Blucher was later beached at Dover, Kent.
John	United Kingdom	The sloop was run down and sunk in the River Humber near Faxfleet, Yorkshire. Her crew were rescued. She was on a voyage from Hull, Yorkshire to Wakefield, Yorkshire.
Medeas	United Kingdom	The ship was wrecked in the Pentland Firth. She was on a voyage from Oulu. Grand Duchy of Finland to Liverpool, Lancashire.
Superior	United Kingdom	The ship was driven ashore at North Somercotes, Lincolnshire. She was on a voyage from Boston, Lincolnshire to Hull, Yorkshire.
Unicorn	United Kingdom	The ship was wrecked north of Slyne Head, County Galway with the loss of all hands.

== 2 December ==
List of shipwrecks: 2 December 1826
Ship	State	Description
Bolivar	United States	The ship was driven ashore and wrecked at Liverpool, Lancashire, United Kingdom. She was on a voyage from New York to Liverpool. Bolivar was refloated on 16 December and taken in to Liverpool.
Castle	United Kingdom	The ship was wrecked on the Little Ross Sandbank with the loss of two lives. She was on a voyage from Belfast, County Antrim to Harrington, Cumberland.
Grand Turk	United States	The ship was driven ashore and damaged at Liverpool. She was on a voyage from Virginia to Liverpool. Grand Turk was refloated on 19 December and taken in to Liverpool.
Harrys	United Kingdom	The ship was driven ashore and damaged at Beaumaris, Anglesey. She was on a voyage from Bangor, Caernarfonshire to Belfast, County Antrim. She was refloated on 5 December and taken in to Beaumaris.
Limerick Packet	United Kingdom	The ship foundered in the North Sea 10 leagues (30 nautical miles (56 km) east north east of Orfordness, Suffolk. Her crew were rescued. She was on a voyage from Antwerp, Netherlands to London.
Liverpool	United Kingdom	The ship was driven ashore on Great Orme Head, Caernarfonshire. She was on a voyage from Liverpool to Dundee, Forfarshire.
Lord Dupplin	United Kingdom	The ship was wrecked on the Dunbar Sand, off Padstow, Cornwall. Her crew were rescued. She was on a voyage from Newport, Monmouthshire to London.
Philomel	United Kingdom	The ship foundered in the Bristol Channel off Ilfracombe, Devon with the loss of all but one of her crew. She was on a voyage from Swansea, Glamorgan to Dartmouth, Devon.
Spring Hill	United Kingdom	The ship was driven ashore at Holyhead, Anglesey. All on board were rescued. She was on a voyage from Saint John, New Brunswick, British North America to the Clyde. Spring Hill was refloated on 29 December and taken in to Holyhead.
Storey	United Kingdom	The ship was wrecked off Whitby, Yorkshire. Her crew were rescued. She was on a voyage from Sunderland, County Durham to Whitby.

== 3 December ==
List of shipwrecks: 3 December 1826
Ship	State	Description
Maria Elizabeth	Netherlands	The ship was driven ashore at Pembrey, Carmarthenshire, United Kingdom. Her crew were rescued. She was on a voyage from Marseille, Bouches-du-Rhône, France to Antwerp Maria Elizabeth later floated off and sank.
Nimrod	United Kingdom	The ship was driven ashore at Hoylake, Lancashire. Her crew were rescued by the Hoylake Lifeboat. She was on a voyage from Penang to Liverpool, Lancashire. Nimrod was refloated on 14 December and taken in to Liverpool.
Princess Charlotte	United Kingdom	The ship was driven ashore at Cooden, Sussex where she was destroyed by fire. She was on a voyage from London to Jamaica.
St. Patrick	United Kingdom	The steamship was severely damaged by fire in the Brunswick Dock, Liverpool, Lancashire.

== 4 December ==
List of shipwrecks: 4 December 1826
Ship	State	Description
Mountaineer	United Kingdom	The ship was damaged on the Herd Sand, in the North Sea off South Shields, County Durham. Her crew were rescued. She was on a voyage from Aberdeen to Sunderland, County Durham. Mountaineer was refloated on 7 December and taken in to North Shields.
Philomel	United Kingdom	The ship was wrecked at Ilfracombe, Devon with the loss of all but one of her crew. She was on a voyage from Swansea, Glamorgan to Dartmouth, Devon.
William	United Kingdom	The ship foundered in the English Channel off Start Point, Devon. Her crew were rescued. She was on a voyage from Falmouth, Cornwall to Southampton, Hampshire.
William and Mary	United Kingdom	The ship was run down and sunk in the English Channel off South Foreland, Kent by Factor (United States). Her crew were rescued. She was on a voyage from London to Shoreham-by-Sea, Sussex.

== 5 December ==
List of shipwrecks: 5 December 1826
Ship	State	Description
Abeona	United Kingdom	The ship was wrecked in the Gut of Canso. Her crew were rescued. She was on a voyage from Quebec City, Lower Canada, British North America to London.
Diana	United Kingdom	The ship was driven ashore near Dunkirk, Nord, France. She was on a voyage from Newcastle upon Tyne, Northumberland to Bordeaux, Gironde, France.
Endeavour	United Kingdom	The ship was wrecked on the Gore Sand, in the Bristol Channel. Her crew were rescued. She was on a voyage from Bristol, Gloucestershire to Bridgwater, Somerset.
Java	United Kingdom	The ship ran aground at Ballycormick Point, County Antrim and was damaged. She was on a voyage from Glasgow, Renfrewshire to Liverpool, Lancashire. Java was refloated and put into Bangor, County Down for repairs.
Sir Francis N. Burton	United Kingdom	The ship was wrecked in the Keeling Islands with the loss of three lives. She was on a voyage from the Cape of Good Hope to Bengal, India.
Three Brothers	United Kingdom	The ship capsized at Fishguard, Pembrokeshire and was wrecked.

== 6 December ==
List of shipwrecks: 6 December 1826
Ship	State	Description
Byron	United Kingdom	The ship was driven ashore near North Somercotes, Lincolnshire. She was on a voyage from Aberdeen to London.
Spanking Jack	United Kingdom	The ship was wrecked on the coast of Corsica, France with the loss of all but one of her crew. She was on a voyage from Penzance, Cornwall to Genoa, Kingdom of Sardinia.

== 7 December ==
List of shipwrecks: 7 December 1826
Ship	State	Description
Lark	United Kingdom	The ship was driven on to the Foreness Rock, Margate, Kent. She was on a voyage from Seville, Spain to London. Lark was refloated on 9 December and resumed her voyage.
Lord Cranstoun	United Kingdom	The West Indiaman was driven ashore and severely damaged at the Birling Gap, Sussex. She was refloated on 20 December and taken in to Newhaven, Sussex
Princess Charlotte	United Kingdom	The ship was driven ashore at Cooden, Sussex. She was on a voyage from London to Jamaica. She was destroyed by fire the next day.

== 8 December ==
List of shipwrecks: 8 December 1826
Ship	State	Description
Goede Hoop	Netherlands	The ship was driven ashore and wrecked on Rügen, Prussia. She was on a voyage from Danzig to Amsterdam, North Holland.
Latona	Denmark	The ship struck a sunken wreck off the Stanford Sandbank and was damaged. She was on a voyage from Bandholm to London, United Kingdom. Latona was taken in to Harwich, Essex, United Kingdom.
Sun	India	The brig was wrecked on a reef in the Torres Strait with the loss of 34 of the 36 people on board. She was on a voyage from Sydney, New South Wales to Calcutta.
Venus	(United Kingdom of Great Britain and Ireland) New South Wales	The brig was wrecked in the Torres Strait.

== 9 December ==
List of shipwrecks: 9 December 1826
Ship	State	Description
Isabella	United Kingdom	The trow was in collision with Union (United Kingdom) in the River Severn at Gloucester and capsized.
Nordkoping	Sweden	The ship was wrecked near Berck, Pas-de-Calais, France with the loss of all hands.

== 10 December ==
List of shipwrecks: 10 December 1826
Ship	State	Description
Magdalena	Bremen	The ship ran aground in the Elbe. She was on a voyage from Havana, Cuba to Bremen. Magdalena was refloated on 16 December.
Tredegar	United Kingdom	The ship was driven ashore at Highbridge, Somerset.

== 12 December ==
List of shipwrecks: 12 December 1826
Ship	State	Description
Britannia	United Kingdom	The ship was abandoned in the Atlantic Ocean. Her crew were rescued by Aurora (Kingdom of Hanover). She was on a voyage from Cádiz, Spain to London.
Fanny	United Kingdom	The ship was driven ashore at Fort Ann, Isle of Man. She was on a voyage from Liverpool, Lancashire to "Amtock".
William Fell	United Kingdom	The ship was driven ashore in Dundalk Bay. She was on a voyage from Miramichi, New Brunswick, British North America to Newry, County Antrim. William Fell was refloated on 19 December.

== 15 December ==
List of shipwrecks: 15 December 1826
Ship	State	Description
Alphonso	United Kingdom	The ship was wrecked on the Gunfleet Sand, in the North Sea off Clacton-on-Sea, Essex. Her crew were rescued. She was on a voyage from South Shields, County Durham to London.
Eliza	United Kingdom	The schooner was severely damaged by fire at Douglas, Isle of Man.

== 16 December ==
List of shipwrecks: 16 December 1826
Ship	State	Description
London	United Kingdom	The ship struck the Corton Sand, in the North Sea off the coast of Suffolk and was consequently beached at Lowestoft, Suffolk. She was on a voyage from Danzig to Great Yarmouth, Norfolk. London was refloated on 22 December and taken in to Great Yarmouth for repairs.
Manoel	Brazil	The ship was captured by ARA Chacabuco (Argentine Navy and was sent int to Buenos Aires but was wrecked at Ensenada, Argentina.
Prince of Saxe Coburg	United Kingdom	The sloop was wrecked in "Fury Harbour", Cockburn Channel, Tierra del Fuego. The crew survived the wrecking.
Swallow	United Kingdom	The ship departed from Gravesend, Kent for Marseille, Bouches-du-Rhône, France. No further trace, presumed foundered with the loss of all hands.

== 17 December ==
List of shipwrecks: 17 December 1826
Ship	State	Description
Ann and Jane	United Kingdom	The sloop struck a rock and foundered off South Bishop, Pembrokeshire. Her crew were rescued. She was on a voyage from Cardiff, Glamorgan to Liverpool, Lancashire.
Brilliant	United Kingdom	The ship ran onto the Blach Rocks, Devon and was severely damaged.

== 19 December ==
List of shipwrecks: 19 December 1826
Ship	State	Description
Rachel	United Kingdom	The ship was driven ashore and severely damaged at Dubmill, Cumberland. She was on a voyage from Glasgow, Renfrewshire to Whitehaven, Cumberland.

== 20 December ==
List of shipwrecks: 20 December 1826
Ship	State	Description
Belle Isle	United Kingdom	The ship was wrecked at Caernarvon. Her crew were rescued. She was on a voyage from Saint John, New Brunswick, British North America to Cork and Beaumaris, Anglesey.
Humility	United Kingdom	The ship ran aground on the Skitter Sand, in the North Sea off the coast of Yorkshire. She was on a voyage from Pillau, Prussia to Hull, Yorkshire. Humility was later refloated and taken in to Hull.
Isabella	United Kingdom	The ship struck a rock in the Sound of Donaghadee and sank. She was on a voyage from Westport, County Mayo to Liverpool, Lancashire.

== 21 December ==
List of shipwrecks: 21 December 1826
Ship	State	Description
Herald	United Kingdom	The whaler was driven ashore and wrecked at Mockbeggar, Cheshire. She was on a voyage from Newfoundland to Liverpool, Lancashire. Herald was refloated on 26 December and taken in to Liverpool.
St. Anne	France	The ship was wrecked off Guernsey, Channel Islands. She was on a voyage from Marennes, Charente-Maritime to Rouen, Seine-Inférieure.

== 23 December ==
List of shipwrecks: 23 December 1826
Ship	State	Description
Monmouth	United Kingdom	The ship was wrecked near "St. Martino Island". Her crew survived. She was on a voyage from North Shields, County Durham to Calcutta, India.

== 24 December ==
List of shipwrecks: 24 December 1826
Ship	State	Description
Marquis Wellington	United Kingdom	The brig was wrecked in Holyhead Bay with the loss of five lives.

== 27 December ==
List of shipwrecks: 27 December 1826
Ship	State	Description
Homer	United States	The ship was wrecked on the Turtle Rock, Bahamas. She was on a voyage from New Orleans, Louisiana to Liverpool, Lancashire, United Kingdom.

== 28 December ==
List of shipwrecks: 28 December 1826
Ship	State	Description
Printemps	France	The ship capsized near Le Conquet, Finistère. Her crew survived.

== 31 December ==
List of shipwrecks: 31 December 1826
Ship	State	Description
Beaver	United Kingdom	The ship was severely damaged by fire at Rotterdam, South Holland, Netherlands.

== Unknown date ==
List of shipwrecks: Unknown date in December 1826
Ship	State	Description
Atlantic	United Kingdom	The ship was driven ashore at Bangor, County Down in late December.
Boyne	United Kingdom	The ship foundered off Bras d'Or, Nova Scotia, British North America.
Fanny	United Kingdom	The ship was driven ashore at Douglas, Isle of Man. She was on a voyage from Liverpool, Lancashire to Amlwch, Anglesey.
Fortuna	Sweden	The ship was driven ashore at Carrara, Grand Duchy of Tuscany in mid-December. She was on a voyage from Gävle to Livorno, Grand Duchy of Tuscany.
Gabriel Kabben	Bremen	The ship was driven ashore and wrecked at "Tjaltdling", Denmark with the loss of three of the five people on board.
Goede Hoop	Netherlands	The ship was driven ashore and wrecked on Rügen, Prussia. She was on a voyage from Danzig, Prussia to Amsterdam, North Holland.
Harding	United Kingdom	The ship was lost on the Silver Keys. She was on a voyage from Liverpool to Jamaica via St. Andrews, New Brunswick, British North America.
Hidda	Wismar	The schooner was wrecked on Falsterbö, Sweden. She was on a voyage from Wismar to Stockholm, Sweden.
Mary and Nancy	United Kingdom	The ship was wrecked in the Abaco Islands.
Penang	United Kingdom	The brig was wrecked on the Tenasserin Coast of Burma in mid-December with the loss of 25 lives.
Royal George	United Kingdom	The ship was wrecked near "Hogstrap", Denmark. She was on a voyage from Saint Petersburg, Russia to Hull, Yorkshire.
Three Brothers	United Kingdom	The ship was wrecked off Fishguard, Pembrokeshire in early December. She was on a voyage from Dublin to Bristol, Gloucestershire.
Venus	France	The ship ran aground in the Garonne. She was on a voyage from Bordeaux, Gironde to Martinique.
