= Warship (disambiguation) =

A warship is a ship built and primarily intended for war.

Warship may also refer to:

- Warship (band), an American post-hardcore band
- Warship (journal), a yearly periodical produced by Conway Publishing
- Warship (1973 TV series), a 1973–1977 British drama television series that was broadcast on BBC1
- Warship (2010 TV series), a 2010 British documentary television series that aired on Channel 5
- Warship (video game), a 1986 computer wargame designed

== British locomotives ==
- British Rail Class 42 B'B' diesel railway locomotives, because they were named after warships
- British Rail Class 43 (Warship Class) B'B' diesel railway locomotives, of similar design but different builder to the British Rail Class 42
- British Rail Class D20/2 'D600' class (also known anachronistically as British Rail Class 41) A1A'A1A locomotives, also named after warships and carrying the sign 'Warship Class' on the nameplate
