= 1698 in science =

The year 1698 in science and technology involved some significant events.

== Astronomy ==
- Christiaan Huygens, in his posthumously published book Kosmotheoros, argues that other planets in the Solar System could contain extraterrestrial life, starting a debate that extends into the 21st century.

== Exploration ==
- November – HMS Paramour sets sail under the command of Edmond Halley on the first purely scientific voyage by an English naval vessel, to investigate magnetic declination.

== Technology ==
- January 11 – April 21 – Tsar Peter the Great of Russia (incognito as 'Peter Mikhailov') visits England as part of his Grand Embassy, making a particular study of shipbuilding.
- July 25 – English engineer Thomas Savery obtains a patent for "A new invention for raising of water... by the impellent force of fire", a steam pump.
- November 14 – First Eddystone Lighthouse illuminated, the first rock lighthouse in Europe.
- The piano is invented by Italian Bartolomeo Cristofori, originally named the "piano et forte" (meaning "soft and loud").
- A metronome is developed as a machine to measure musical tempo.

== Events ==
- November – Tani Jinzan, astronomer and calendar scholar, observes a fire destroy Tosa in Japan at the same time as a Leonid meteor shower, taking it as evidence to reinforce belief in the "Theory of Areas".

== Births ==
- February – Colin Maclaurin, Scottish mathematician (died 1746)
- February 16 – Pierre Bouguer, French mathematician (died 1758)
- March 26 – Václav Prokop Diviš, Czech theologian and natural scientist (died 1765)
- May 8 – Henry Baker, English naturalist (died 1774)
- July 17 – Pierre Louis Moreau de Maupertuis, French mathematician (died 1759)
- November 28 – Charlotta Frölich, Swedish agronomist (died 1770)

== Deaths ==
- August 18 – Nicolas Venette, French physician, sexologist and writer (born 1633)
- November 4 – Rasmus Bartholin, Danish scientist (born 1625)
