= Jean Hood =

Jean Hood is a maritime author and historian.

== Biography ==
Jean Hood was born in 1953. Jean Hood read English Literature at the University of Durham and began her professional career working in the cardboard industry as an advertising copywriter. Advertising soon led Hood to Lloyd's Register of Shipping where she became Information Officer during the 1980s. This posting marked a turn in her career; drawing on a continued passion for history, her job at Lloyd's Register of Shipping inspired a love for maritime history. She became an authoritative figure and consultant in this field, answering questions from private individuals, researchers and maritime art dealers. Her subsequent research on the 18c East Indiaman, ‘Winterton’, spanning two decades, became the subject of her first non-fiction book, Marked For Misfortune, published in 2003 by Conway Maritime Press.

In 2006, Hood released Come Hell and High Water, an examination of several infamous or less well-known shipwrecks, to general critical acclaim. Warship International Fleet Review wrote that it ‘reads like the best fiction, yet they are all true stories’. It entered 2007's Good Book Guide, which commended the piece as ‘Meticulously researched and compelling.’ Janet Dempsey writing for the BBC's Who Do You Think You Are? magazine asserted ‘This is pure maritime magic’. Her next book, Submarine an anthology concerned with personal accounts of submarine warfare during the Second World War, followed in 2007 and also attracted positive reviews: ‘Hood has created a lasting tribute to all those who fought and died in these "iron coffins".'

In 2009 Hood wrote the foreword to Dark Navy: The Italian Regia Marina and the Armistice of 8 September 1943 by Dr Enrico Cernuschi and Vince O'Hara, published by Nimble Books LLC, which was described as "a masterful account of the Regia Marina's role in the [Italian] Armistice of 1943".

In an interview with The Sentinel in August 2010, Hood explained the intention of her latest work, Carrier: A Century of First-hand Accounts of Naval Operations in War and Peace (2010): ‘my book tells the human, rather than the technical, story of aircraft carriers and naval aviation, using eye-witness stories from those who served.’ Navy News described it as ‘probably the definitive book on life in the capital ship of the past seventy or so years… pretty much everything involving carrier operations, full stop, is covered.’

Hood lives in Cheshire, and has been quoted in her books as enjoying walking and opera. In 2010, Hood was commissioned to write the accompanying book to a major new exhibition on the war correspondent to be held at the Imperial War Museum North in Manchester, beginning the end of May 2011. According to the IWM, it will be 'the UK's largest ever exhibition about reporting war, featuring some of the people whose words, images, voices and faces bring the story from the frontline'.

== Bibliography ==
- The Dragon of Brog, Oxford University Press (1994). ISBN 978-0-19-272289-8
- Marked for Misfortune: An Epic Tale of Shipwreck, Human Endeavour and Rescue in the Age of Sail, Conway Maritime Press (2003). ISBN 978-0-85177-941-6
- Trafalgar Square: A Visual History of London’s Landmark Through Time, Batsford (2005). ISBN 978-0-7134-8967-5
- Come Hell and High Water: Extraordinary Stories of Wreck, Terror and Triumph on the Sea, Conway Publishing (2006). ISBN 978-1-84486-034-0
- Submarine: An Anthology of First-hand Accounts of the War Under the Sea, 1939-45, Conway Publishing (2007). ISBN 978-1-84486-046-3
- Dark Navy: The Italian Regia Marina and the Armistice of 8 September 1943 [Foreword], Nimble Books (2009). ISBN 978-1-934840-91-7
- Carrier: A Century of First-hand Accounts of Naval Operations in War and Peace, Conway Publishing (2010). ISBN 978-1-84486-111-8
- War Correspondent: Reporting Under Fire Since 1850, Conway Publishing (2011). ISBN 978-1-84486-131-6
