= Karl Heinz Marquardt =

German-born marine modeller, artist and author (1927–2019)

Karl Heinz Marquardt (9 November 1927 – 31 January 2019) was a German-born marine modeller, artist and author.

== Biography ==
Karl Heinz Marquardt was born on 9 November 1927 in Hamburg, Germany. He inherited a passion for all things nautical from his father, a mariner, war artist, model-maker and marine artist, who had exhibited in museums across Germany.

He served his country in World War II with the Kriegsmarine, subsequently joining the post-war British-led German Mine Sweeping Administration. In 1949, Marquardt joined forces with his father, creating far in excess of a hundred new exhibits and restoring antique artefacts across the whole spectrum of ship evolution for museums damaged during the war, including the Deutsche Museum at Munich (see Adler von Lübeck). His expertise was utilised by private and corporate clients including a German model manufacturer, designing 8 model kits for beginners, several shipyards, and in twelve prestigious museums across Europe.

Marquardt emigrated from Germany to Australia in 1966, taking on several significant posts in the succeeding decades. Following tenure as Chief Modeller for General Motors Holden, he became the Melbourne Maritime Museum's Honorary Curator for Ship Models and Paintings, creating several Australian maritime history paintings for the museum, and a Valuer of Ship Models for the Taxation Incentive Scheme for the Arts. As one of the few members of the Enterprize Committee, in 1990, he researched and drew up the drawings for the ‘replica of schooner Enterprize’, the vessel of Melbourne's founding fathers. Later he designed and wrote about an alternative to the ‘Duyfken replica’, the V.O.C. vessel which in 1606 made the first documented European landing on Australian soil.

As the Australian National Maritime Museum, Sydney, asserts, the ‘replica of James Cook’s HMB Endeavour’, which began in 1988 in Fremantle, Western Australia, ‘is one of the world’s most accurate maritime reproductions.’ Marquardt's expertise was utilised in the construction of the replica, a subject he reprised in his book Captain Cook’s Endeavour (1995) as part of Conway's Anatomy of the Ship series.

Marquardt has written several books on ship design and construction, both in English and his native tongue, German. Of note are his standard Eighteenth Century Rigs and Rigging (1992) and The Global Schooner: Origins, Development, Design and Construction 1695-1845 (2003). His article V.O.C. Tender Duyfken 1603-1606, an alternative to the replica is another outstanding example.

A highly skilled draughtsman, Marquardt provided the drawings for Brian Lavery and Geoff Hunt's The Frigate Surprise: The Design, Construction and Careers of Jack Aubrey’s Favourite Command (2008), which examines the real historic ship behind the Patrick O’Brian novels.

In 1987 and 1989 Marquardt was commissioned by the Reserve Bank of Australia to produce maritime drawings for the commemorative $10 and the current $20 notes. He was a regular contributor to Conway's quarterly journal Model Shipwright.

Marquardt was a fellow of the Australian Society of Marine Artists and was made an Honorary Member of the Russian Guild of Ship Modellers for ‘his outstanding contributions to international ship modelling.’

Marquardt had a dedicated website created by Kay Wunder, where many of his articles can be read. He died on January 31, 2019.

== Bibliography ==
=== Books ===
- The 44-Gun Frigate, USS Constitution, “Old Ironsides”: Anatomy of the Ship, Conway (2005) ISBN 1-84486-010-8
- The Global Schooner: Origins, Development, Design and Construction 1695-1845, Conway Maritime Press (2003) ISBN 0-85177-930-1
- HMS Beagle, Survey Ship Extraordinary: Anatomy of the Ship, Conway Maritime Press (1999) ISBN 0-85177-703-1
- Captain Cook’s Endeavour: Anatomy of the Ship, Conway Maritime Press (1995/2010) ISBN 1-55750-118-1 ISBN 0851778968
- Eighteenth Century Rigs and Rigging, Conway Maritime Press (1992) ISBN 0-85177-586-1
- Bemastung und Takelung von Schiffen des 18. Jahrhunderts, Hinstorff Verlag (1986) and Delius Klasing (1986) ISBN 3-7688-0526-3, Weltbild Verlag (1994) ISBN 3-89350-538-5
- Schooner in Nord und Süd, Hinstorff Verlag (1989) ISBN 3-356-00253-8 and Delius Klasing (1990) ISBN 3-7688-0672-3
- Endeavour, Delius Klasing (1995) ISBN 3-7688-0910-2
- Рангоуτ, τакелаж и паруса судов XVIII века, Russian Translation of Bemastung und Takelung etc. Sudostrojenije (1991) ISBN 5-7355-0131-3

=== Contributions to books ===
- The Line of Battle, Conway's History of the Ship, Chapter 4 & 9, 'The Fore and Aft Rigged Warship', pp. 63 – 84, and 'Rigs and Rigging', pp. 125 – 136, Conway Maritime Press (1992) ISBN 978-0-85177-561-6
- The Age of Sail: 'Wapen von Hamburg III, 1722–1737', pp. 105 – 114, and 'The Royals: A Historical Review', pp. 173 – 175, Conway Maritime Press (2003) ISBN 0-85177-949-2
- The Frigate Surprise, Chapter 5: The Drawings pp. 64 – 71, Conway Maritime Press (2008) ISBN 978-1-84486-074-6
- Special Edition: Seiner Majestät Bewaffneter Schoner Berbice 1789/96, Das Logbuch (1999) ISSN 0175-7601

=== Articles ===
Marquardt has written over 50 articles in maritime journals across the world, including:

- ‘Do We Really Know the Endeavour?’, The Great Circle, 8, 1 (1986) pp. 27–32
- ‘H.M. Bark Endeavour, What Do We Really Know About the Ship?’, Nautical Research Journal, 35, 1 (1990) pp. 28–41
- 'The Duyfken Enigma: Some alternate Design Possibilities', The Great Circle, 29, 1 (2007) pp. 41 – 57
- 'V.O.C.-Jacht Duyfken, eine echte Replik?', Das Logbuch 44, 1, (2008) pp. 4 – 15

' 1603 V.O.C. Tender Duyfken Vereinigte Provinzen', www.segelschiffsmodellbau.com

=== Model kits ===
Eight Model kits were designed between 1958 and 1966

- 'Osebergschiff' for Graupner Modelle Kirchheim-Teck
- 'Bunte Kuh von Flandern' for Graupner Modelle Kirchheim-Teck
- 'Santa Maria' for Graupner Modelle Kirchheim-Teck
- 'Adler von Lübeck' for Graupner Modelle Kirchheim-Teck
- 'Mayflower' for Graupner Modelle Kirchheim-Teck
- 'Pamir' for Graupner Modelle Kirchheim-Teck
- 'Graf Zeppelin' for Graupner Modelle Kirchheim-Teck
- 'Esso Berlin' for Graupner Modelle Kirchheim-Teck
