= James Lees =

British maritime expert and writer (1924–2002)

James Gilbert Lees (13 June 1924 – 13 October 2002) was a British maritime expert and writer who was curator of the ship collection and Senior Conservation Officer at the National Maritime Museum, Greenwich.

== Life and career ==
Born on 13 June 1924, James Lees served both in the Royal Navy aboard destroyers and on tankers in the Merchant Navy.

In addition to his active service, Lees (often referred to as "Jim") had a passion for ship modelling, leading him to construct and restore many models of historic vessels. Many of these are displayed across the world, most notably at the collection of the National Maritime Museum, of which Lees was curator and Senior Conservation Officer. His expertise on model restoration was utilised on items in "The Tradescant Collection", held at the Ashmolean Museum, University of Oxford.

Lees' 1979 publication The Masting and Rigging of English Ships of War: 1625–1860, drawn from 15 years of research, is widely regarded as an authority and the definitive study of its respective field. The author’s intention was to "assist restorers of marine paintings in the difficult task of replacing obliterated rigging, as well as providing a handbook of technical information for the maritime and war historian".

Lees died on 13 October 2002, at the age of 78.

== Bibliography ==
- The Masting and Rigging of English Ships of War, 1625–1860. London: Conway Maritime Press. 1979. ISBN 0-85177-136-X. OCLC 5288163.
- The Masting and Rigging of English Ships of War, 1625–1860 (revised ed.). London: Conway Maritime Press. 1984. ISBN 0-85177-290-0. OCLC 12407251.
