= Richard Endsor =

British historian and artist

Richard Endsor is a British naval historian and maritime artist.

== Professional career ==
Richard Endsor trained as a production engineer, before working for BroomWade, an international engineering company, where he became responsible for all aspects of production engineering for the rotary air compressor range. He left in 1981, spending the following decade as an international contract engineer, writing computer programs for the aerospace industry.

A lifelong maritime enthusiast, Endsor has devoted many years to researching ships and shipbuilding of the 17th century, culminating in his 2009 publication, Restoration Warship: The Design, Construction and Career of a Third Rate of Charles II’s Navy, which he wrote and illustrated himself. As the journal Warships International Fleet Review notes, ‘Endsor is also an artist, creating superb and extensive series of line and wash drawings, which illustrate virtually every step of the construction of the Lenox.’ The journal continues that Endsor’s ‘attention to detail and depth of research [is] quite breathtaking.’

For Andrew Lambert, of King’s College, London, ‘Restoration Warship will be essential reading for students of the 16th, 17th, and 18th-century navies’. Author and historian J.D. Davies has labelled Endsor ‘the leading authority on warship design and construction in the Restoration period’.

In addition to writing and lecturing on the subject, Endsor has forged a successful career in naval illustration, exhibiting his many artworks and producing the dust jackets for several books. Influenced by the Restoration artists the Van De Veldes, and their contemporaries, Endsor often consults Van De Velde originals for historical accuracy, seeking to emulate some of their respective styles. Writing in the International Journal of Maritime History, John Mckay heralded Endsor as ‘an accomplished draughtsman and artist’. Endsor has exhibited at the Royal Society of Marine Artists.

== Bibliography ==
=== Books ===
- The Restoration Warship: The Design, Construction and Career of a Third Rate of Charles II's Navy, Conway Publishing (2009) ISBN 978-1-84486-088-3
- ‘The Gunner’s Table’, in Shipwright 2010, Conway Publishing (2009) ISBN 978-1-84486-108-8
- ‘The Rigging’, in Mary Rose: Your Noblest Shippe, ed. Peter Marsden, The Mary Rose Trust (2009)

=== Articles ===
- ‘The Van de Velde Paintings for the Royal Yacht Charlotte’, Mariner’s Mirror, 94, 3 (2008)
- ‘The Midship Bend of Hampshire 1653’, Mariner’s Mirror, 91, 1 (2005)
- ‘The Loss of Stirling Castle 1703, Mariner’s Mirror, 90, 1 (2004)

=== Artwork ===
- Illustrator for The Lady and Her Ships, Tobias Philbin, Pier Books (2010)
- Dust jacket for Gentleman Captain, J.D. Davies, Old Street Publishing (2009) ISBN 0-547-38261-8
- Dust jacket for Shipwright 2010, Conway Publishing (2009) ISBN 978-1-84486-108-8
- Dust jacket for History of English Ordnance: Volume II, Adrian Caruana, Jean Boudriot Publications (1997) ISBN 0-948864-22-2
- Dust jacket for A Distant Storm: The Four Days’ Battle of 1666, Frank Fox, Jean Boudriot Publications (1996) ISBN 0-948864-29-X
- Dust jacket for History of English Sea Ordnance: Volume I, Adrian Caruana, Jean Boudriot Publications (1994) ISBN 0-948864-20-6

== Television appearances ==
- Expert commentator for ‘Great Lewis’, Wreck Detectives, RDF Media (2004)
- Expert commentator for ‘Stirling Castle’, Wreck Detectives, RDF Media (2003)
- Commentator for The One Show, London, 2011, BBC
