= 1692 in science =

The year 1692 in science and technology:

== Events ==
- In the American colonies, the Salem witch trials develop, following 250 years of witch-hunts in Europe.

== Mathematics ==
- The tractrix, sometimes called a tractory or equitangential curve, is first studied by Christiaan Huygens, who gives it its name.
- John Arbuthnot publishes Of the Laws of Chance (translated from Huygens' De ratiociniis in ludo aleae), the first work on probability theory in English.

== Medicine ==
- Thomas Sydenham's Processus integri ("The Process of Healing") is published posthumously.

== Births ==
- April 22 – James Stirling, Scottish mathematician (died 1770)

== Deaths ==
- May – John Banister, English missionary and botanist, accidentally shot (born 1654)
