= 1746 in science =

The year 1746 in science and technology involved some significant events.

== Chemistry ==
- John Roebuck invents the lead-chamber process for the manufacture of sulfuric acid.
- German chemist Andreas Sigismund Marggraf (1709–1782) is credited with describing zinc as a separate metal.
- Eva Ekeblad discovers how to make flour and alcohol out of potatoes.

== Geology ==
- Jean-Étienne Guettard presents the first mineralogical map of France to the French Academy of Sciences.
- William Cookworthy discovers kaolin in Cornwall.

== Mathematics ==
- Jean le Rond d'Alembert develops the theory of complex numbers.
- Patrick d'Arcy announces discovery of the principle of angular momentum in a form known as "the principle of areas" (areal velocity).
- Scottish mathematician Matthew Stewart publishes Some General Theorems of Considerable use in the Higher Parts of Mathematics, including an account of Stewart's theorem on the measurement of the triangle.

== Physics ==
- Pierre Louis Maupertuis reads before the Berlin Science Academy the paper Recherche des Lois du Mouvement. He claims that nature acts in such a way as to minimize the product of mass times velocity times distance, in an incomplete but seminal idea that derives in what is known today as the Principle of least action.

== Technology ==
- Pierre Bouguer publishes a treatise on naval architecture, Traité du navire, which first explains use of the metacentric height as a measure of ships' stability.
- John Muller publishes A Treatise Containing the Elementary Part of Fortification.

== Zoology ==
- Linnaeus publishes Fauna Svecica.

== Awards ==
- Copley Medal: Benjamin Robins

== Births ==
- January 4 – Benjamin Rush, Founding Father of the United States, chemist and physician (died 1813)
- March 7 – André Michaux, French botanist (died 1802)
- March 15 – Giovanni Battista Venturi, Italian physicist after whom the Venturi tube is named (died 1822)
- May 9 – Gaspard Monge, French mathematician and geometer (died 1818)
- July 16 – Giuseppe Piazzi, Italian Theatine monk, astronomer and mathematician (died 1826)
- July 30 – Louise du Pierry, French astronomer (died 1807)
- Isaac Swainson, English botanist (died 1812)

== Deaths ==
- June 14 – Colin Maclaurin, Scottish mathematician (born 1698)
- November 14 – Georg Steller, German naturalist (born 1709)
