= 1735 in science =

The year 1735 in science and technology involved some significant events.

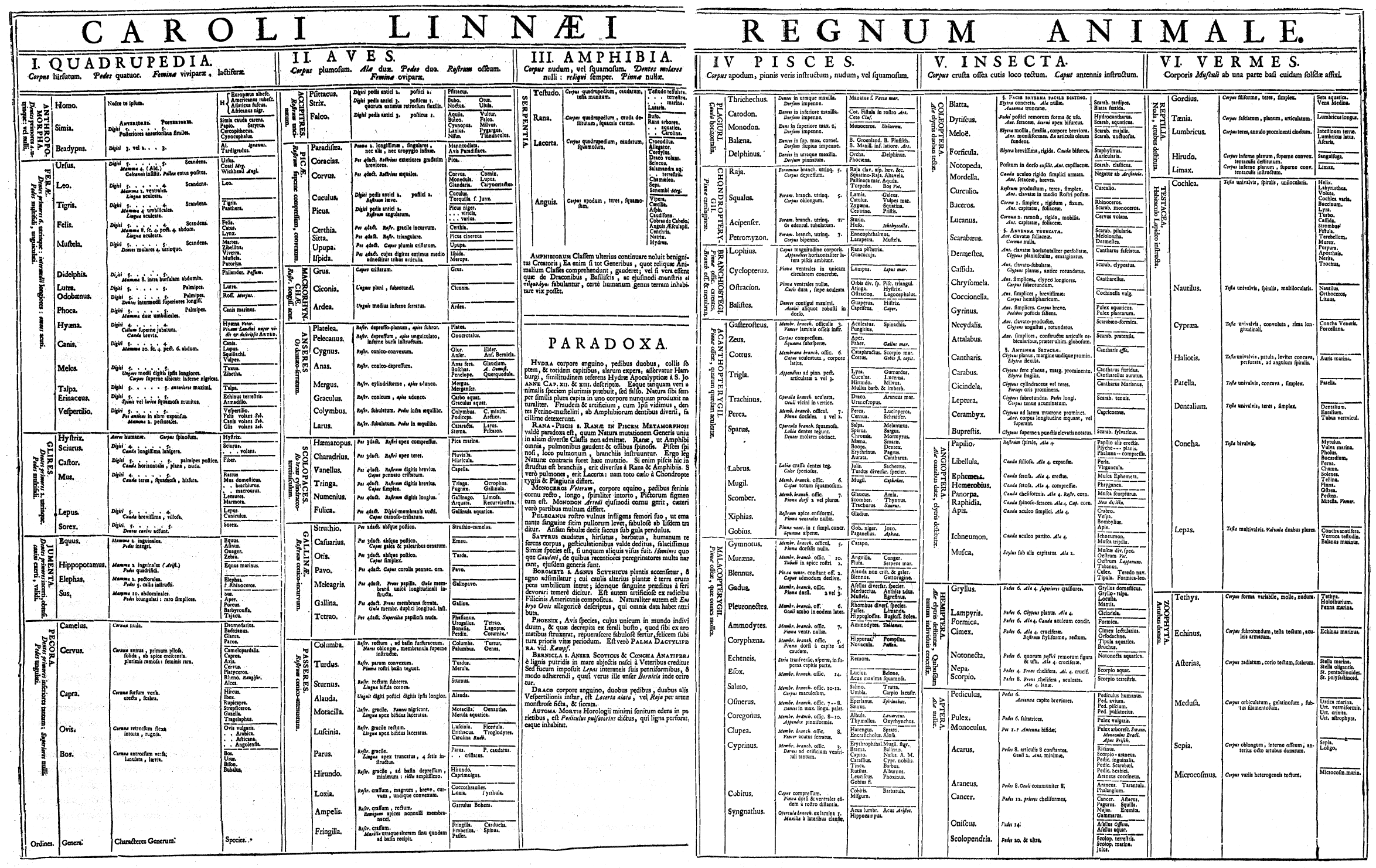
Linnaeus' classification of animals

== Astronomy ==
- July 11 - Pluto (not known at this time) enters a fourteen-year period inside the orbit of Neptune, which will not recur until 1979.

== Biology ==
- Carl Linnaeus publishes the first edition of his Systema Naturæ in Leiden.

== Chemistry ==
- Cobalt is discovered and isolated by Georg Brandt. This is the first metal discovered since ancient times.

== Earth sciences ==
- May 30 – French Geodesic Mission to the Equator (including Charles Marie de La Condamine, Pierre Bouguer, Louis Godin, Jorge Juan, Antonio de Ulloa, Joseph de Jussieu and Jean Godin) sets out from La Rochelle for the Spanish Peruvian Territory of Quito (modern-day Ecuador).

== Mathematics ==
- Leonhard Euler solves the Basel problem, first posed by Pietro Mengoli in 1644, and the Seven Bridges of Königsberg problem.

== Meteorology ==
- May 22 – George Hadley publishes the first explanation of the trade winds.

== Physiology and medicine ==
- December 6 – The second successful appendectomy is performed by naturalised British surgeon Claudius Aymand at St George's Hospital in London (the first was in 1731).

== Births ==
- April 21 – Ivan Petrovich Kulibin, Russian inventor (died 1818)
- May 17 (bapt.) – John Brown, Scottish physician (died 1788)
- August 7 – Claudine Picardet, French, chemist, mineralogist, meteorologist and scientific translator (died 1820)
- September 6 – John Joseph Merlin, Liégeois-born inventor (died 1803)
- October 6 – Jesse Ramsden, English scientific instrument maker (died 1800)
- December 4 – Josephus Nicolaus Laurenti, Viennese herpetologist (died 1805)

== Deaths ==
- February 27 – Dr John Arbuthnot, British polymath (born 1667)
- September 27 – Peter Artedi, Swedish naturalist (born 1705)
