= 1758 in science =

The year 1758 in science and technology involved some significant events.

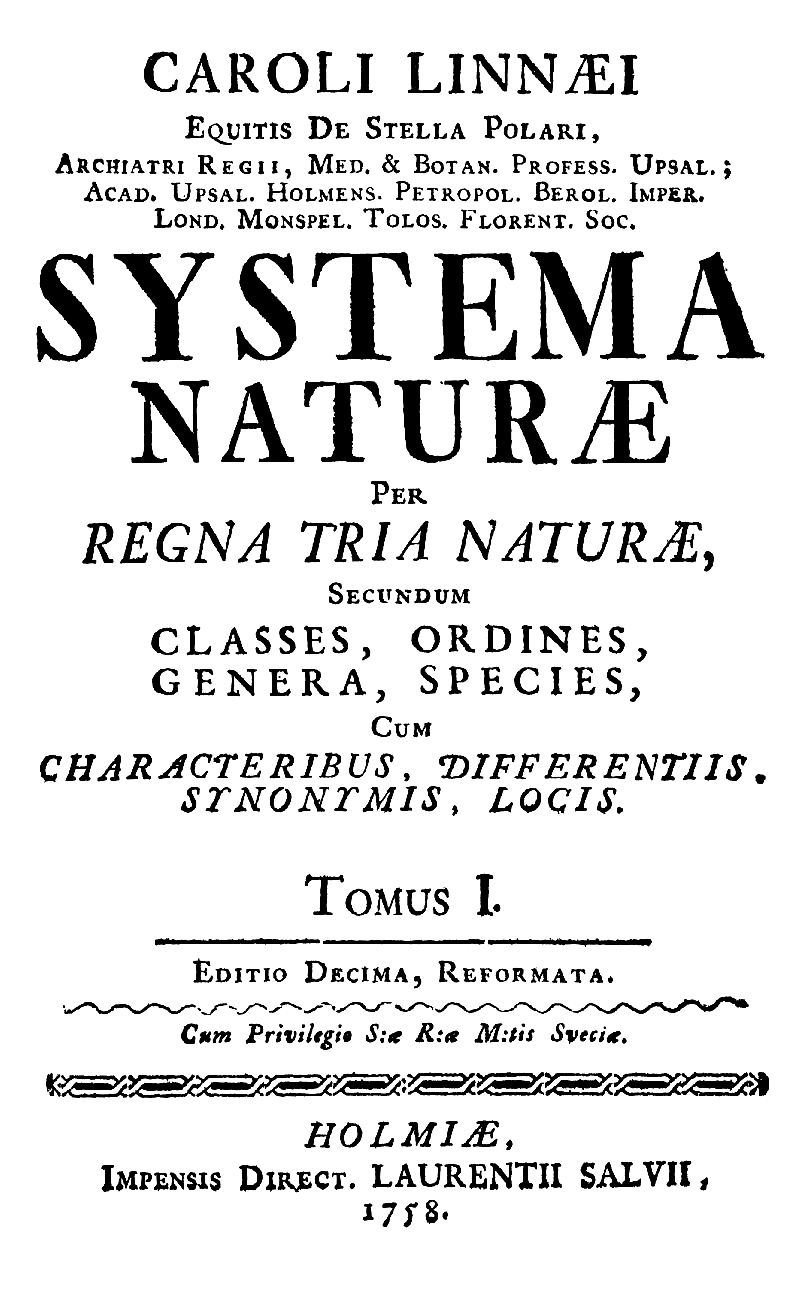
10th edition of Systema Naturae

== Astronomy ==
- December 25 – Halley's Comet is sighted by Johann Georg Palitzsch, confirming Edmund Halley's 1705 prediction of its periodicity.

== Chemistry ==
- John Champion patents a process for calcining zinc sulphide into an oxide usable in the retort process.

== Medicine ==
- French midwife Angélique du Coudray demonstrates the first obstetric mannequin.
- Scottish physician Francis Home makes the first attempt to deliver a measles vaccine.

== Physics ==
- Ruđer Bošković publishes his atomic theory in Philosophiæ naturalis theoria redacta ad unicam legem virium in natura existentium ("Theory of natural philosophy reduced to one law of the forces existing in nature").
- John Dolland presents his "Account of some experiments concerning the different refrangibility of light" (Philosophical Transactions of the Royal Society (London)) describing the discovery of a means of constructing doublet achromatic lenses by the combination of crown and flint glasses, reducing chromatic aberration.

== Zoology ==
- January 1 – Swedish biologist Carl Linnaeus (Carl von Linné) publishes in Stockholm the first volume (Animalia) of the 10th edition of Systema Naturae, the starting point of modern zoological nomenclature, introducing binomial nomenclature for animals to his established system of Linnaean taxonomy. Among the first examples of his system of identifying an organism by genus and then species, Linnaeus identifies the lamprey with the name Petromyzon marinus. He introduces the term Homo sapiens. (Date of January 1 assigned retrospectively.)

== Awards ==
- Copley Medal: John Dollond

== Births ==
- January 20 – Marie-Anne Pierrette Paulze, French chemist (died 1836)
- March 9 – Franz Joseph Gall, German-born neuroanatomist (died 1828)
- March 14 – Franz Bauer, Moravian-born botanical illustrator (died 1840)
- June 29 – Clotilde Tambroni, Italian philologist and linguist (died 1817)
- July 31 – Rosalie de Constant, Swiss naturalist (died 1834)
- October 11 – Heinrich Wilhelm Matthäus Olbers, German astronomer (died 1840)

== Deaths ==
- January 18 – François Nicole, French mathematician (born 1683)
- April 22 – Antoine de Jussieu, French naturalist (born 1686)
- August 15 – Pierre Bouguer, French mathematician (born 1698)
- September 5 (NS) – Dmitry Ivanovich Vinogradov, Russian chemist (born c. 1720)
- October – Elizabeth Blackwell, British botanical illustrator (born 1707)
