= Peter Goodwin (maritime author) =

British maritime historian and author

Peter Goodwin is a British maritime historian and author, and the former Keeper and Curator of HMS Victory.

== Biography ==
Peter Goodwin served in the Royal Navy in nuclear submarines, qualifying as a marine engineer. Subsequently, he worked in Glasgow as a consultant design engineer, before completing an MPhil at the Institute of Maritime Studies, at the University of St Andrews. As an article by Haley Storey explains, "Peter's interest in 18th century ship construction began when he was just eight years old and, like many boys his age, he enjoyed putting together wooden models".

Between 1991 and 2011, he was the Keeper and Curator of HMS Victory, HM Naval Base Portsmouth.

He has written eight books on ship construction and Britain's maritime heritage, specialising in the career and ships of Lord Nelson. Goodwin "is widely acknowledged as one of the leading writers on the sailing warship".

Of Nelson's Ships (2002), Nautical Magazine wrote "Superb description of life in the Georgian Navy… Compelling read recommended to everyone with an interest in naval history".

Goodwin's Nelson’s Men O’War (2005), released to coincide with the bi-centenary of the Battle of Trafalgar, was written in conjunction with the National Maritime Museum, Greenwich.

Goodwin has also acted as a historical consultant, most notably on the 20th Century Fox film, Master and Commander: The Far Side of the World, inspired by Patrick O’Brian's series of Aubrey–Maturin novels, and the television adaptation of Hornblower, in which he made a brief cameo.

== Bibliography ==
- HMS Victory (2006) ISBN 0-7117-4019-4
- The Ships of Trafalgar: The British, French and Spanish Fleets, October 1805, Conway Publishing (2005) ISBN 978-1-84486-015-9
- Nelson's Men O'War: The Illustrated Story of Life in Nelson's Navy, Andre Deutsch Ltd (2005) ISBN 1-84442-367-0
- The Bomb Vessel Granado, 1742: Anatomy of the Ship, Conway Publishing (2005) ISBN 978-1-84486-005-0
- Nelson's Victory: 101 Questions & Answers about HMS Victory, Nelson’s Flagship at Trafalgar 1805, Conway Maritime Press (2004) ISBN 978-0-85177-988-1
- Nelson's Ships: A Comprehensive History of the Ships in Which He Served, 1771–1805, Stackpole Books (2002) ISBN 0-8117-1007-6
- The Naval Cutter Alert, 1777: Anatomy of the Ship, Conway Maritime Press (1991) ISBN 0-9615021-8-5
- The 20-Gun Ship Blandford: Anatomy of the Ship, Conway Maritime Press (1988) ISBN 0-87021-058-0
- The Construction and Fitting of the Sailing Man of War 1650–1850, Conway Maritime Press (1987) ISBN 0-87021-016-5
