= Prince of Saxe Coburg (1816 ship) =

History

United Kingdom
- Name: Unknown
- Launched: Cowes, 1803
- Renamed: Prince of Saxe Cobourg (1816)
- Fate: Wrecked 16 December 1826

General characteristics
- Tons burthen: 103, or 10382/94, or 105, or 106, or 107 (bm)
- Sail plan: Sloop or schooner

Prince of Saxe Coburg (or Prince Saxe Coburg) was launched at Cowes around 1803, originally under another name. She acquired the name Prince of Saxe Coburg in 1816. She then sailed to the eastern Atlantic. Her owners decided in 1826 to send her on a seal hunting voyage to the South Shetland Islands. She was wrecked at Tierra del Fuego in December.

== Career ==
Prince of Saxe Coburg first appeared in Lloyd's Register (LR) in 1816. Original research may be required to determine her earlier name or names.

Year	Master	Owner	Trade	Source & notes
1816	Jn.Ladd	Underwood	London–Rotterdam	LR
1819	J.Ladd; Smith	Underwood; Pirie & Co.	London–Rotterdam; London–Madeira	LR
1822	G.Smith; Tremayne	Pirie & Co.	London–Madeira	LR; small repairs 1822, & "No Hemp"
1826	Tremayne; Carss	Pirie & Co.	Plymouth–Gibraltar	LR; almost rebuilt 1823 & damages repaired 1824
1827	Carss	Pirie & Co.	London–CGH	LR; almost rebuilt 1823 & damages repaired 1824

Pirie & Co. appointed Matthew Brisbane captain of Prince of Saxe Coburg on 16 June 1826. Brisbane had returned in April from the third of three voyages to the South Shetland Islands in Beaufoy. Pirie & Co. outfitted Prince of Saxe Coburg for a sealing voyage to the South Shetlands. Having come from London, on 20 July she sailed from Bona Vista, Cape Verde for the South Shetlands.

== Fate ==
While off the South Shetlands Prince of Saxe Coburg encountered bad weather and pack-ice. Brisbane sailed to Tierra del Fuego to effect repairs. On 16 December 1826, as she was at anchor in Cockburn Channel, violent williwaws (cold blasts of wind) drove her ashore and wrecked her. All 21 crew members survived, and were able to rescue three boats and provisions.

The men established a camp. In subsequent weeks one man died and an accidental explosion of a casks of gunpowder severely injured another. Three crew members became mutinous and were exiled to three separate islands with a week's provisions each. Eventually Brisbane permitted seven crew members to take the largest boat. These men survived and joined a Buenos Aires squadron operating against Brazil. Brisbane sent the other two boats out to scout for possible rescuers. On 3 March 1827, one boat encountered HMS Beagle, under the command of Captain Pringle Stokes, who sent two launches 80 miles through the Barbara Channel to rescue Brisbane and the remaining survivors from Prince of Saxe Coburg.
