= Shipwright (annual) =

Ship-modelling magazine

Shipwright is a specialist ship-modelling annual published by Conway Publishing. Its full title is Shipwright: The International Annual of Maritime History & Ship Modelmaking.

== History of Model Shipwright ==
The first edition Shipwright 2010 was published in November 2009, yet its heritage stems back to 1972, when it first appeared in a quarterly format as Model Shipwright. The annual has supplanted its predecessor, which ran for 144 issues, incorporating its style and focus into one yearly publication. It is aimed at all ship-modelling enthusiasts, with an emphasis on those who build their works from scratch.

The annual was released in conjunction with an official online presence, Shipwright Online, intended both as a forum for its readership and an archive of past issues.

As Baird Maritime writes, ‘Basically comprising a series of well-illustrated essays describing a selection of very high quality ship modelling projects, the book includes vignettes of maritime history and an interesting interview with the Director of Britain’s National Maritime Museum at Greenwich.’ The world-wide shipping magazine Sea Breezes regards the annual as ‘A must have annual for model-making enthusiasts.’

The 2012 Shipwright annual was published in January 2012.
The 2013 "Shipwright" annual was published in May 2013.

== New format ==
Since its inception, Shipwright has been co-edited by John Bowen C Eng MRNI with Dr Martin Robson. Bowen preserves the long lineage of Model Shipwright, having worked actively on the journal since its creation in 1972, subsequently becoming its editor in 1974 until the final instalment.

In the first annual, the editors assert that the change of format from a quarterly journal to an annual has three major benefits. Firstly, rather than serialising longer articles over several issues, these could now be incorporated in entirety into a single volume. Secondly, the new format allowed enhanced size and clarity of images, presented in full colour for the first time. Finally, a greater emphasis could be placed on historical contextualisation in order to complement the existing craft-based articles. According to Julian Stockwin, the renowned author of naval fiction, 'The first edition of the annual has an impressive line-up of material, not only by model makers for model makers but discussions of new findings relating to ship design and construction by experts in their fields.'

== Shipwright Annual – John Bowen retires in 2014 ==
Conway Publishing announced on April 25, 2014, that there will be no "Shipwright" annual for 2014. This may or may not be related to the fact, that Conway Publishing is forced to seek for a new Editor, after John Bowen stepped down as Editor:

... We would be looking for a candidate with a very good level of experience in book or magazine publishing alongside an excellent knowledge of ship modeling and maritime history, combined with an active involvement in the ship-modeling community. ...

== Editions ==
=== Shipwright ===
- Shipwright 2013, ed. John Bowen and Jean Hood, Conway Publishing (May 2013) ISBN 9781844861606
- Shipwright 2012, ed. John Bowen and Martin Robson, Conway Publishing (January 2012) ISBN 978-1844861491
- Shipwright 2011, ed. John Bowen and Martin Robson, Conway Publishing (November 2010) ISBN 978-1-84486-123-1
- Shipwright 2010, ed. John Bowen and Martin Robson, Conway Publishing (November 2009) ISBN 978-1-84486-108-8

=== Model Shipwright ===
Model Shipwright, 1–144, Conway Maritime Press (1972–2009)

== Contributors ==
The non-exhaustive list is in alphabetical order:

- John M. Bingeman
- Rorke Bryan
- Bruce Buchanan
- John Dodd
- Richard Endsor
- Peter Goodwin
- R. Guzman
- John R. Haynes
- Geoff Hunt RSMA
- Jonathan Kinghorn
- John Laing
- Lloyd McCaffery
- David Mills
- John Pocius
- J. Pottinger
- John Thompson
- Robert A. Wilson
- John York
