= Warship (magazine) =

British military magazine

Warship (ISSN 0142-6222) is a long-running yearly publication covering the design, development, and service history of combat ships. It is published by Conway Publishing in the United Kingdom and the United States Naval Institute Press in North America.

== History ==
Warship began as a quarterly magazine, which according to The Dreadnought Project, published "historical and technical essays of incredible value and merit to students of fighting ships". The first issue, edited by Antony Preston, was published in January 1977; featured articles included "Washington's Cherrytrees: The Evolution of the British 1921–22 Capital Ships", by N.J.M. Campbell, and "British Destroyer Appearance in World War II: Fleet Destroyers 1939–42", by Alan Raven. The journal became an annual in 1989, under the editorship of Robert Gardiner. Under this new format, The Dreadnought Project notes, "it remains the "periodical" that deserves a space on your reference bookshelf long after it has been read the first time."

== Current status ==
Since 2004, Warship has been edited by John Jordan. Each annual issue comprises articles by retired naval officers, marine architects, and maritime experts spanning the globe. In 2003 Sea Power wrote "This first-class compendium of articles on the world’s warships has something of interest for virtually every reader".

== Index of issues ==
A comprehensive index of past issues and their articles at The Dreadnought Project.

== Editorial history ==
The following persons have been editor-in-chief of the magazine:

- John Jordan: Warship 2005–2012
- Antony Preston: Warship 1999–2004
- David McLean and Antony Preston: Warship 1996–1998
- John Roberts: Warship 1994–1995
- Robert Gardiner: Warship 1989–1993
- Ian Grant: Volume XII
- Andrew Lambert: Volumes IX–XI
- Randal Gray: Volume VIII
- John Roberts: Volumes III–VII
- Antony Preston: Volumes I & II

== Notable contributors ==
Notable contributors include:

- Andrew Lambert
- Vincent P. O'Hara
