= James Taylor (British author) =

British art expert (born 1963)

James Taylor (born 1963) is a British author, expert on maritime art, and former curator of the National Maritime Museum, Greenwich, east London.

== Biography ==
Taylor was educated at the Universities of St Andrews and Manchester. Early in his career, Taylor spent time as an auctioneer with Phillips Fine Art Auctioneers, where he was the Victorian paintings specialist. From 1989, he was a curator of paintings, drawings and prints, exhibition organiser and Corporate Membership Manager at the National Maritime Museum, Greenwich. He began to publish on marine art in the mid 1990s, and was a popular lecturer for the Arts Society for more than two decades.

Taylor has written several books, including illustrated histories on maritime and yachting art, and, in 2008, The Voyage of the Beagle, charting the story of the ship made famous by Charles Darwin. In March 2009, Dr John Van Wyhe wrote in BBC History Magazine, that The Voyage of the Beagle "brings together a wonderful mixture of old and new illustrations and information about the voyage from wildly scattered sources." He has also produced a study on the popular English 20th century cartoonist and Punch magazine editor, Fougasse, who created the anti-rumour and gossip posters during World War II. His publication Your Country Needs You - The Secret History of the Propaganda Poster (Saraband, August 2013) was timed to coincide with the start of the World War I commemorations in 2014. Dazzle - Disguise & Disruption in War & Art and Pack Up Your Troubles - How Humorous Postcards Helped to Win World War One were published in September and October 2016 by The Pool of London Press and Bloomsbury respectively.

Taylor guest-curated the exhibition Dazzle - Disguise and Disruption in War and Art at the St Barbe Museum & Art Gallery in Lymington (16 June -23 September 2018) that included loans from private and public collections including: the British Museum, Imperial War Museum, National Maritime Museum, Greenwich, Russell-Cotes, Southampton City Art Gallery, Tate Britain and the V & A. Also, co-organised the Dazzle study day at the University of Southampton on 30 June 2018.

== Awards and recognition ==
Among Taylor’s professional achievements are several Sir James Caird Awards for writing, and the Sir Geoffrey Callender Award for outstanding achievement in supporting the public lecture programme and developing the corporate membership scheme of the National Maritime Museum. For more than two decades he worked as a freelance writer, exhibition organiser and lecturer, and was a popular speaker for the Arts Society.

In June 2015 Taylor was awarded a PhD from the University of Sussex for his thesis on William Westall (1781-1850) the 'landscape and figure draughtsman' who sailed with Matthew Flinders on the voyage of HMS Investigator (1801-3) – the first recorded circumnavigation of Australia.

His publication The Voyage of the Beagle... was short-listed for the Mountbatten Maritime Prize in 2016.

Taylor is a Fellow of the Royal Society of Arts.

== Bibliography ==
- Marine Painting: Images of Sail, Sea and Shore, Studio Editions (1995). ISBN 978-1-85891-240-0.
- Yachts On Canvas: A Pictorial History of Yachting, Conway Maritime Press (1998). ISBN 978-0-85177-719-1.
- Yachts On Canvas: Artists’ Images of Yachts from the Seventeenth Century to the Present Day, Conway Maritime Press (2005). ISBN 978-1-84486-020-3.
- Rule Britannia!: Art, Royalty, and Power in the Age of Jamestown, with Richard Ormond, Virginia Museum of Fine Arts (2008). ISBN 978-0-917046-87-2.
- The Voyage of the Beagle: Darwin’s Extraordinary Adventure in Fitzroy’s Famous Survey Ship, Conway Publishing (2008). ISBN 978-1-84486-066-1.
- Careless Talk Costs Lives: Fougasse and The Art of Public Information, Conway Publishing (2010). ISBN 978-1-84486-129-3.
- Your Country Needs You - The Secret History of the Propaganda Poster, Saraband (2013). ISBN 978-188735497-4.
- Pack Up Your Troubles - How Humorous Postcards Helped to Win World War One, Bloomsbury (2016). ISBN 978-1-84486-341-9.
- Dazzle - Disguise and Disruption in War and Art, Pool of London Press (2016). ISBN 978-1-910860-14-4.
- Picturing the Pacific - Joseph Banks and the shipboard artists of Cook and Flinders, Bloomsbury (2018). ISBN 978-1-4729-5543-2.
