= Urban climatology =

Scientific study of atmosphere and the urban environment

Urban climatology is the scientific study of the interactions between urban environments and the atmosphere. It examines how cities modify local and regional climate through processes such as the urban heat island effect, altered wind flows, and changes in energy and moisture exchanges. The field is strongly linked to research on climate change, since urban areas are major sources of greenhouse gas emissions and are especially vulnerable to rising temperatures and extreme weather events.

The discipline has its origins in the early nineteenth century with the work of Luke Howard, who documented systematic differences between urban and rural temperatures. It developed further in the twentieth century through advances in meteorological observation, remote sensing, and numerical modelling. Researchers have since identified key components of the urban atmosphere, including the urban canopy layer, the zone between the ground and average building height, and the urban boundary layer, which extends above and is influenced by the integrated exchanges of heat, moisture, and momentum from the city surface.

Contemporary urban climatology addresses both fundamental processes and applied challenges. It investigates how land use, building form, and vegetation influence local meteorological conditions, and it develops strategies to mitigate adverse impacts such as heat stress and air pollution. Applications include the design of ventilation corridors, the use of green infrastructure, and the integration of climate analysis into urban planning. The field is increasingly interdisciplinary, linking atmospheric science with architecture, public health, and sustainability studies, and has become central to efforts to adapt cities to a warming climate.

== History ==
Luke Howard is considered to have established urban climatology with his book The Climate of London, which contained continuous daily observations from 1801 to 1841 of wind direction, atmospheric pressure, maximum temperature, and rainfall.

Urban climatology came about as a methodology for studying the results of industrialization and urbanization. Constructing cities changes the physical environment and alters energy, moisture, and motion regimes near the surface. Most of these alterations can be traced to causal factors such as air pollution; anthropogenic sources of heat; surface waterproofing; thermal properties of the surface materials; and morphology of the surface and its specific three-dimensional geometry—building spacing, height, orientation, vegetative layering, and the overall dimensions and geography of these elements. Other factors are relief, proximity to water bodies, size of the city, population density, and land-use distributions.

== Influential factors ==
Several factors influence the urban climate, including city size, the morphology of the city, land-use configuration, and the geographic setting (such as relief, elevation, and regional climate). Some of the differences between urban and rural climates include air quality, wind patterns, and changes in rainfall patterns, but one of the most studied is the urban heat island (UHI) effect.

=== Temperature and urban heat island effect ===
Urban environments, and slightly downwind, are typically warmer than their surroundings, as documented over a century ago by Howard. Urban areas are islands or spots on the broader scale compared with more rural surrounding land. The spatial distribution of temperatures occurs in tandem with temporal changes, which are both causally related to anthropogenic sources.

The urban environment has two atmosphere layers, besides the planetary boundary layer (PBL) outside and extending well above the city: (1) The urban boundary layer is due to the spatially integrated heat and moisture exchanges between the city and its overlying air. (2) The surface of the city corresponds to the level of the urban canopy layer. Fluxes across this plane comprise those from individual units, such as roofs, canyon tops, trees, lawns, and roads, integrated over larger land-use divisions (for example, suburbs). The urban heat island effect has been a major focus of urban climatological studies, and in general the effect the urban environment has on local meteorological conditions. These are sometimes measured by micronets or mesonets, as well as by Earth observation satellites.

=== Pollution ===
The field also includes the topics of air quality, radiation fluxes, microclimates and even issues traditionally associated with architectural design and engineering, such as wind engineering. Causes and effects of pollution as understood through urban climatology are becoming more important for urban planning.

=== Precipitation ===
Changes in winds and convection patterns over and around cities impact precipitation. Contributing factors are believed to be urban heat island, heightened surface roughness, and increased aerosol concentration.

== Climate change ==
Urban climatology is strongly linked to research surrounding global warming. As centers for socioeconomic activities, cities produce large amounts of greenhouse gases (GHGs), most notably CO_{2} as a consequence of human activities such as transport, development, waste related to heating and cooling requirements etc.

Globally, cities are expected to grow into the 21st century (and beyond) - as they grow and develop the landscapes in which they inhabit will change so too will the atmosphere resting above them, increasing emissions of GHGs thus contributing to the global greenhouse effect.

Finally, many cities are vulnerable to the projected consequences of climate change (sea level rise, changes in temperature, precipitation, storm frequency) as most develop on or near coastlines, nearly all produce distinct urban heat islands and atmospheric pollution: as areas in which there is concentrated human habitation these effects potentially will have the largest and most dramatic impact (e.g. the 2003 European heat wave that especially deadly in France) and thus are a major focus for urban climatology.

== Spatial planning and public health ==
Urban climatology impacts decision-making for municipal planning and policy in regards to pollution, extreme heat events, stormwater modeling, and social order impacts

== See also ==
- Effects of climate change
- Stuttgart § Climate atlas and ventilation corridors
