= HMS Paramour =

Royal Navy research ship built in 1694

History

England
- Name: HMS Paramour
- Builder: Fisher Harding, Deptford
- Launched: April 1694
- Fate: Sold on 22 August 1706

General characteristics
- Class & type: 6-gun pink
- Tons burthen: 89 bm
- Length: 64 ft 8 in (19.7 m)
- Beam: 18 ft (5.5 m)
- Draught: 9 ft 6 in (2.90 m)
- Propulsion: Sails
- Sail plan: Full-rigged ship
- Complement: Approximately 20
- Armament: 6 guns

HMS Paramour was a 6-gun pink of the Royal Navy, briefly commanded by the astronomer Edmond Halley, initially as a civilian and later as a "temporary captain".

Paramour was built by Fisher Harding of Deptford and launched in April 1694. She was rigged as a three-masted ship and was the first vessel built specifically as a research vessel for the Royal Navy. On one occasion during her sea-trials the visiting Tsar Peter I took her helm.

After three voyages under Halley's captaincy she was refitted in 1702 as a bomb ketch (equipped with a large calibre mortar) in which capacity she remained in the Royal Navy until 22 August 1706 when she was sold to Captain John Constable for (probably) mercantile service. Her subsequent fate is unknown.
