= Sympiesometer =

Type of barometer

Sympiesometer inscribed at bottom Improved sympiesometer and at top A R Easton, 53 Marischal Street, Aberdeen. Owned by descendants of the Aberdeen shipbuilding Hall family.

A sympiesometer is a compact, lightweight type of barometer widely used on ships in the 19th century. Its sensitivity also enabled its use for measuring altitude.

A sympiesometer has two parts: a mercury thermometer for calculating the expansion or contraction of the fluid in the barometer, and the barometer itself, consisting of a J-shaped tube open at the lower end and closed at the top, with small reservoirs at each end. The lower part of the tube and its associated reservoir were filled with colored almond oil, while the upper part and its reservoir contained hydrogen gas. Increasing air pressure would cause the oil to be pushed out of the lower reservoir and into the tube, compressing the hydrogen gas into the upper reservoir. The pressure was indicated by the position of the top of the oil. To correct for temperature, a sliding scale was used; the operator would first use the thermometer to set the scale and then measure the pressure from it.

The basic idea is similar to the common weather glass that had been in use for some time, but the use of highly compressible hydrogen in a long, thin tube allowed much more accurate measurements, as changes in pressure resulted in much more movement of the liquid. The basic concept was initially demonstrated by Robert Hooke, which he referred to as the Otheometer. However, it remained unused until it was re-introduced by Alexander Adie.
