= Conway Publishing =

British publishing company

Conway Publishing, formerly Conway Maritime Press, is an imprint of Bloomsbury Publishing. It is best known for its publications dealing with nautical subjects.

== History ==
Conway Maritime Press was founded in 1972 as an independent publisher. Its origins lay in catering for a specialised readership, publishing quarterly journals such as Model Shipwright and Warship, which would subsequently evolve into the popular annuals still existent today. These, along with the long-running Anatomy of the Ship series, published in conjunction with the Naval Institute Press in the United States, have become stalwarts of the Conway catalogue. Over its history, it has built an extensive catalogue of books specialising in maritime heritage, ship design and construction, and naval military history, from authoritative figures such as Brian Lavery, 'one of the best naval historians in Britain, if not the world,' according to BBC History Magazine. Nautical Magazine wrote, of Richard Endsor's Restoration Warship, 'From the dust cover into the book and right the way through it, this is a magnificent publication with a tremendous amount of detail.'

== Conway Publishing ==
In 2005 Anova Books bought Conway Maritime Press. Around this time the publisher was renamed Conway Publishing. Whilst still committed to producing specialist maritime books, Conway broadened their catalogue to incorporate general, military and aviation history, exploration, as well as railway and scale modelling (with Hornby and Airfix), amongst other related topics.

In recent years, Conway has found success with several television series tie-ins. In line with the current heritage culture espoused by television shows such as BBC's Who Do You Think You Are? and coordinating with several recent international anniversaries, Conway released a series of popular nostalgic reproduction wartime pocket-books ranging from officers' manuals, the Spitfire, to the Home Guard.

Conway has also produced the books to accompany James May's Toy Stories and the Dan Snow-presented Empire of the Seas, both aired on the BBC. The latter book, written by Brian Lavery, would become a No. 2 Sunday Times Bestseller. In April 2010, Conway attained the book rights to Bruce Parry's Arctic adventure, broadcast on BBC2 later in the year.

In September 2014 Bloomsbury Publishing bought Conway from Anova to join its existing Adlard Coles Nautical imprint. As of 2018, Warship is published by Bloomsbury's Osprey Publishing imprint.

== Bibliography ==
A selection of works:

=== Annuals and series ===
- Shipwright (formerly Model Shipwright)
- Warship
- Anatomy of the Ship
- Conway's All the World's Fighting Ships (4 volumes covering from 1860 to 1995)

=== Television accompaniments ===
- James May's Toy Stories, James May (2009) ISBN 978-1-84486-107-1
- Empire of the Seas, Brian Lavery (2009) ISBN 978-1-84486-109-5
- Arctic, Bruce Parry (2011) ISBN 978-1-84486-130-9

=== Featured works ===
- Face to Face: Polar Portraits, Huw Lewis-Jones (2009) ISBN 978-1-84486-099-9
- The Restoration Warship, Richard Endsor (2009) ISBN 978-1-84486-088-3
- Hitler's Army, David Stone (2009) ISBN 978-1-84486-084-5
- The Voyage of the Beagle, James Taylor (2008) ISBN 978-1-84486-066-1
- The Marine Art of Geoff Hunt, Geoff Hunt (2004) ISBN 978-1-84486-000-5
- The Royal Yacht Britannia: The Official History, Richard Johnstone-Bryden (2003) ISBN 978-0-85177-937-9
- Nelson's Navy, Brian Lavery (1989) ISBN 978-0-85177-521-0

=== Pocket books ===
- The Spitfire Pocket Manual, compiled and introduced by Martin Robson (2010) ISBN 978-1-84486-120-0
- The Secret Agent's Pocket Manual: 1939-1945, Stephen Bull (2009) ISBN 978-1-84486-103-3
- Not Enough Room To Swing a Cat: Naval Slang and its Everyday Usage, Martin Robson (2008) ISBN 978-1-84486-073-9
- The Royal Navy Officer's Pocket-Book, 1944, edited by Brian Lavery (2007) ISBN 978-1-84486-054-8

== Authors ==
A list of Conway authors (in alphabetical order):

- John Blake
- John Bowen
- Philip Dawson
- Richard Endsor
- Ewart C. Freeston
- Peter Goodwin
- Jean Hood
- Geoff Hunt
- Richard Johnstone-Bryden
- Andrew Lambert
- Brian Lavery
- James Lees
- Huw Lewis-Jones
- James May
- Bruce Parry
- Antony Preston
- Martin Robson

Robert C. Sinclair<maritime author/Across the Irish Sea>

- David Stone
- James Taylor
