= Alexander Adie =

Scottish maker of medical instruments, optician and meteorologist (1775 - 1858)

Alexander Adie FRSE MWS
- Born: 7 November 1775; Edinburgh, Scotland
- Died: 4 December 1858 (aged 83); Edinburgh, Scotland
- Notable work: sympiesometer
- Scientific career
- Fields: optics medical instrumentation meteorology

Alexander James Adie FRSE MWS (7 November 1775, Edinburgh – 4 December 1858, Edinburgh) was a Scottish maker of medical instruments, optician and meteorologist. He was the inventor of the sympiesometer, patented in 1818.

== Life ==
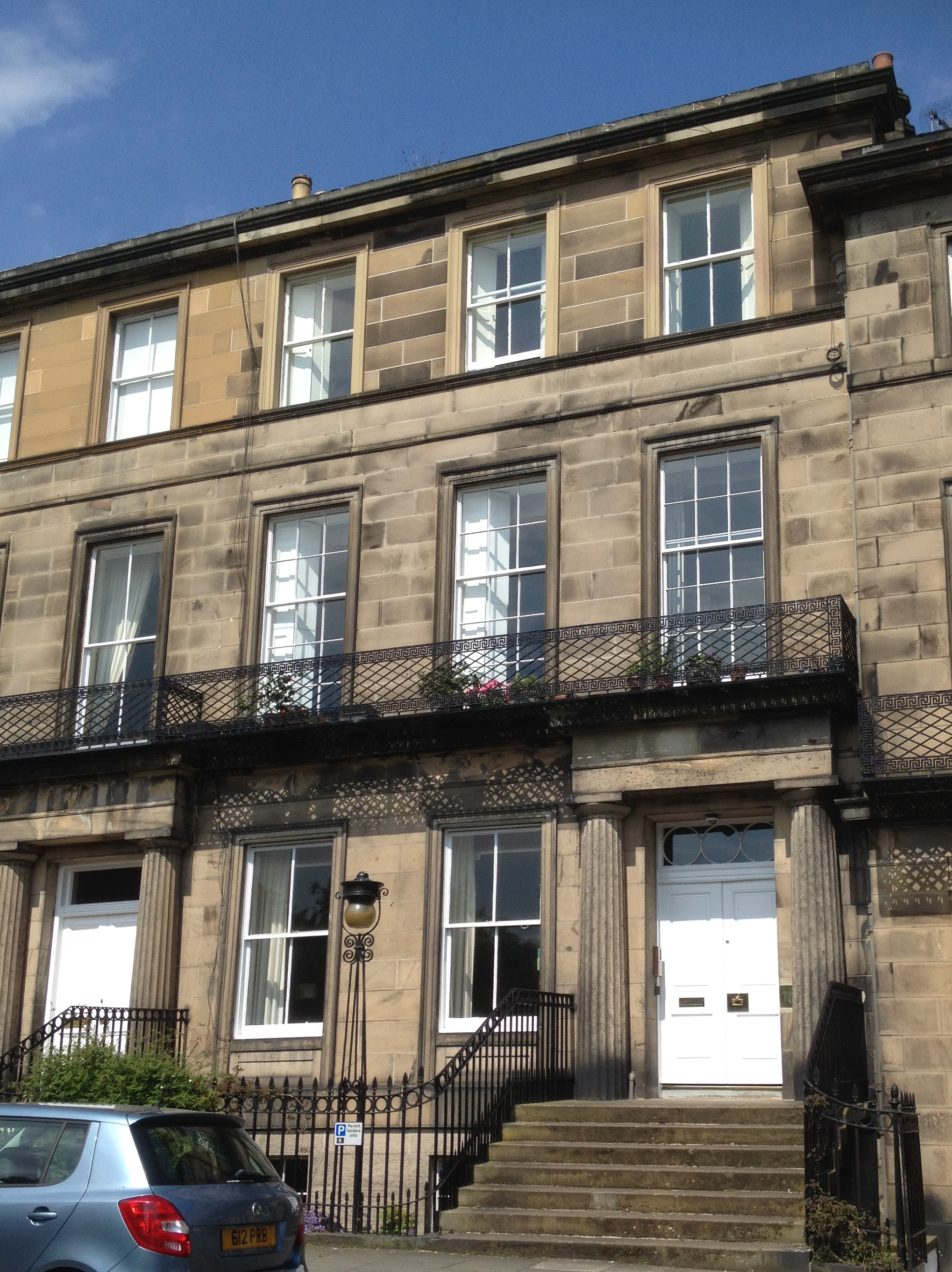
10 Regent Terrace, Edinburgh

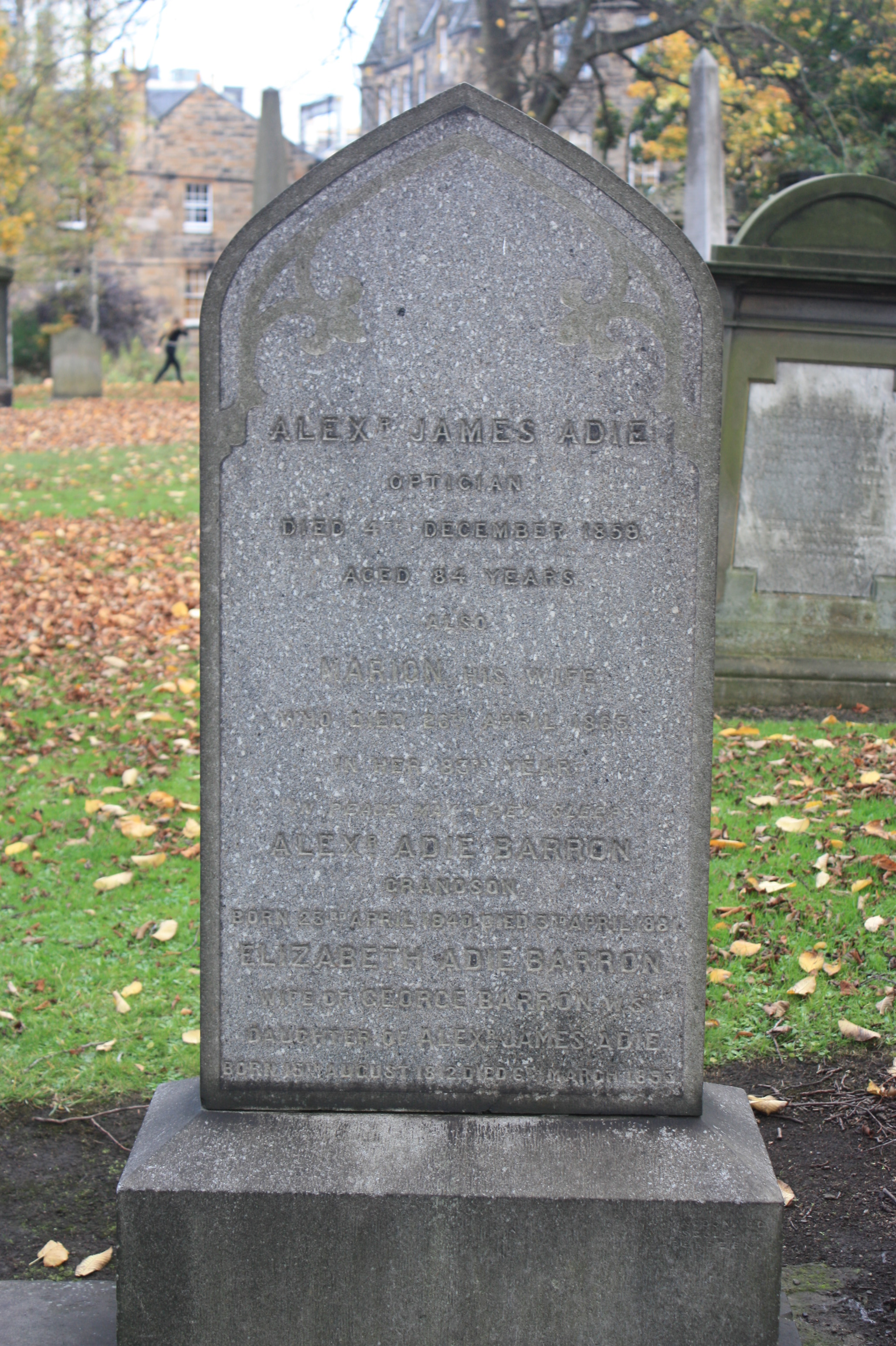
The grave of Alexander James Adie, Greyfriars Kirkyard

He was born the son of optician John Adie FRSE (died 1857).

He was apprenticed in 1789 to his maternal uncle John Miller a mathematical instrument maker on Parliament Close, off the Royal Mile close to St Giles Cathedral in Edinburgh. In 1800 Adie was working for Miller at 38 South Bridge and the business was described as an optician. Around 1805 went into business together as "Miller and Adie, Opticians" (also serving as mathematical instrument makers, but this was in much less demand) and had a shop at 15 Nicholson Street in the South Side which continued until 1822.

After Miller died Adie opened his own shop at 58 Princes Street close to the Royal Scottish Academy.

Adie supplied lenses to Joseph Hooker, Charles Darwin and Sir David Brewster and was optician to William IV and to Queen Victoria. Adie invented the sympiesometer or marine barometer and had a small observatory erected long before there was a public observatory in Edinburgh. He was elected as Fellow of the Royal Society of Edinburgh on 25 January 1819, upon the proposal of Lord Francis Gray, Sir David Brewster and James Russell.

Adie lived at 10 Regent Terrace, Edinburgh, from 1832 to 1838. His son John Adie FRSE joined his firm around 1840 to create Adie & Son based at 50 Princes Street.

He died at Caanan Lodge, in the Morningside district of Edinburgh (now demolished) in December 1858, and was interred in Greyfriars Kirkyard. The grave lies to the south-west of the church, just to the north-east of the Adam mausoleum.

== Family ==
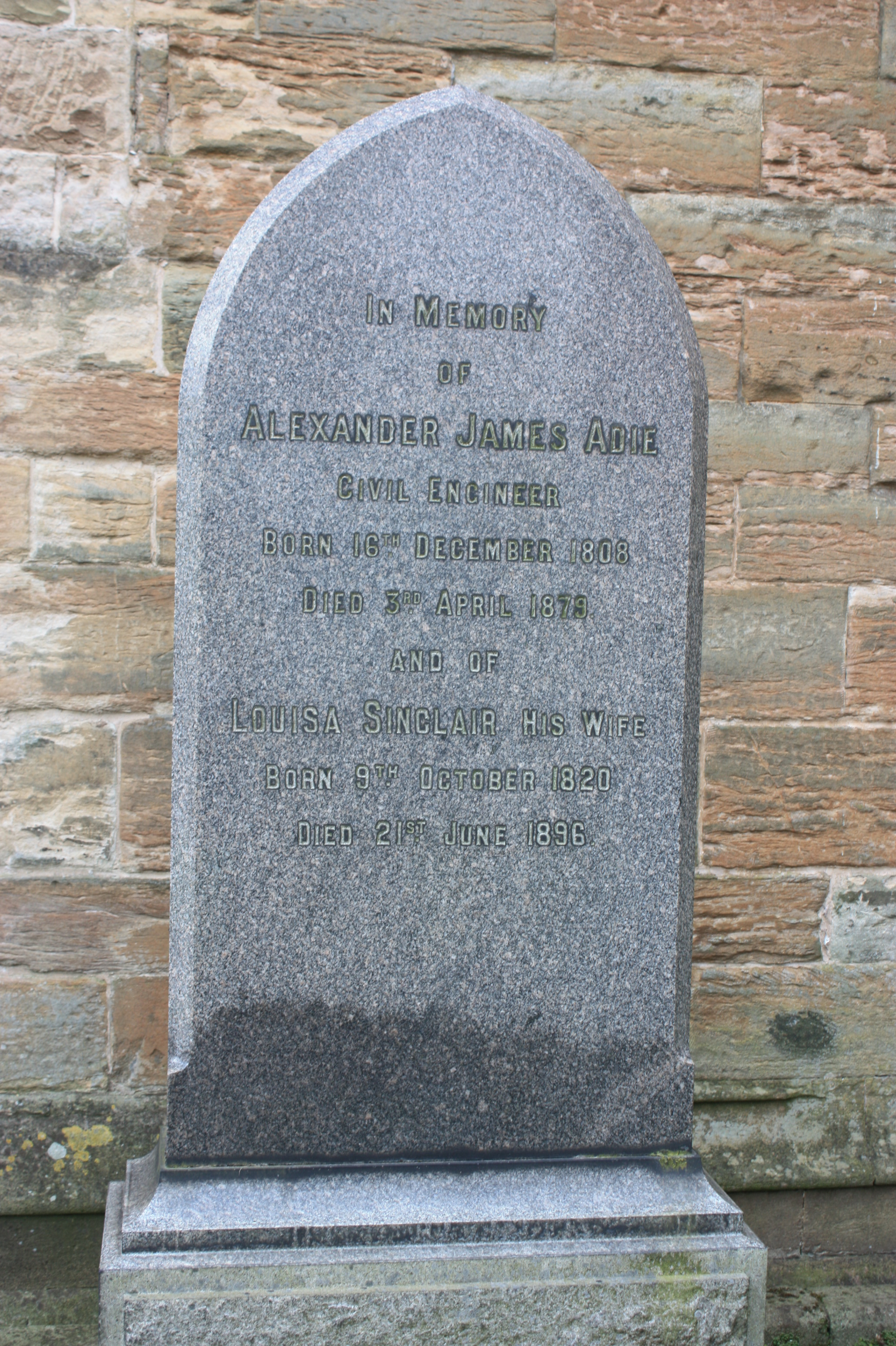
The grave of Alexander James Adie (son), St Michaels Churchyard, Linlithgow

His daughter married the astronomer Thomas Henderson who would certainly have met through the instrument making. Henderson is buried with Adie but is not listed on the memorial. His son, Patrick Adie, left for London in 1844, setting up in business as an instrument maker there. Patrick married Clementina Hellaby, with whom they had a son Walter Sibbald Adie who became a teacher of Indian Languages at Cambridge University after a career in the Indian Civil Service.

=== Alexander James Adie (railway engineer) ===
Adie's son was born at 11 Lothian Street in Edinburgh's South Side on 16 December 1808 and also named Alexander James Adie after his father.

He studied at the High School in Edinburgh and then Edinburgh University before training as a civil engineer under James Jardine.

In 1836 he became Resident Engineer on the Bolton, Chorley and Preston Railway. In 1847-63 he became civil engineer & Manager of the Edinburgh and Glasgow Railway.

In February 1846 he followed in his father's footsteps and was elected a Fellow of the Royal Society of Edinburgh his proposer being James David Forbes. At this time he was living at 50 Princes Street above his father's shop.

In later life he lived at 7 St Andrews Square in Edinburgh (now demolished).

He died at his home, Rockville near Linlithgow, where he had retired to, on 3 April 1879. He is buried on the south side of St Michael's Church in Linlithgow.
