= Atmospheric electricity =

Electricity in planetary atmospheres

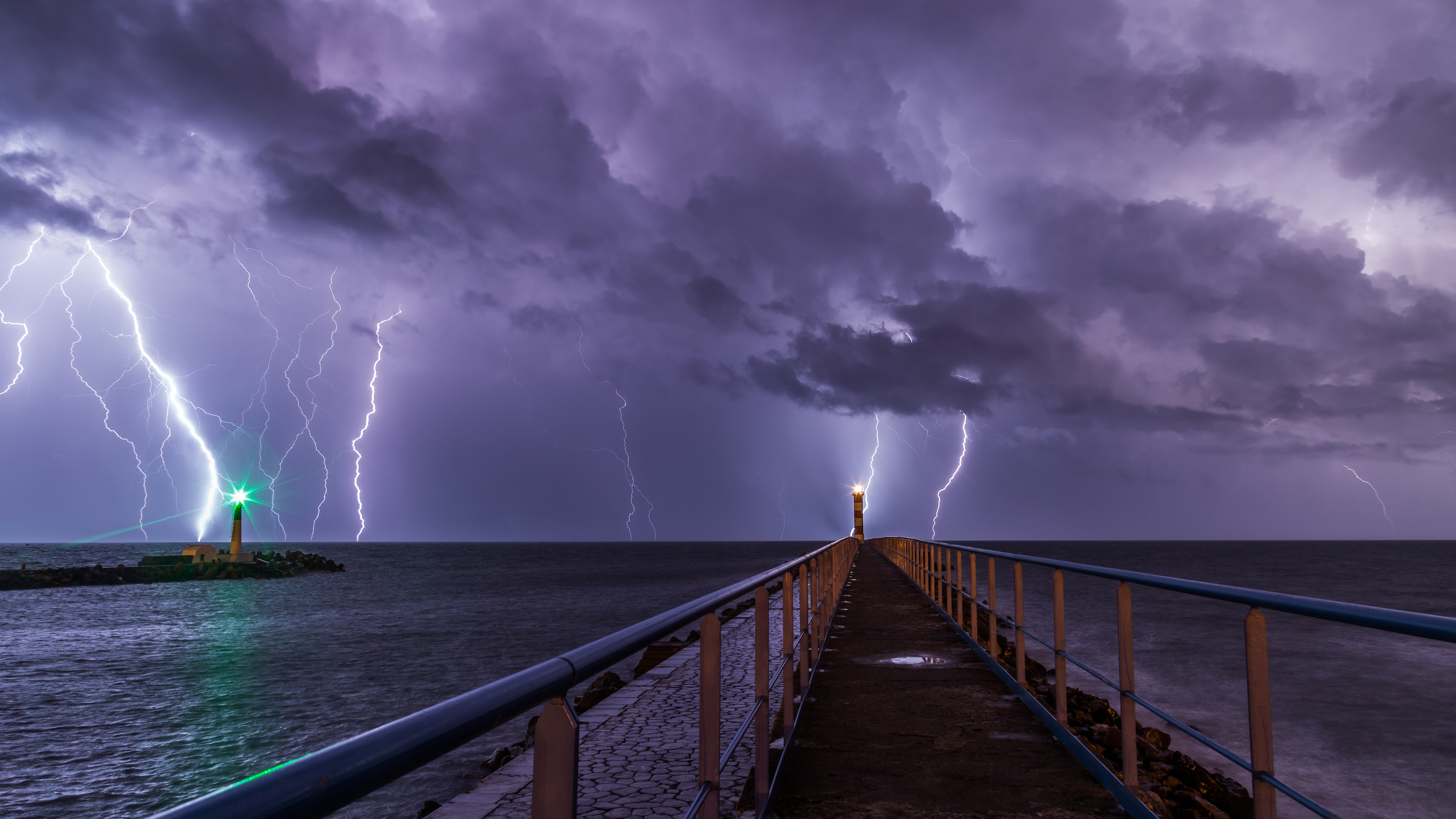
Cloud-to-ground lightning. Typically, lightning discharges 30,000 amperes, at up to 100 million volts, and emits light, radio waves, x-rays and even gamma rays. Plasma temperatures in lightning can approach 28,000 kelvins.

Atmospheric electricity describes the electrical charges in the Earth's atmosphere (or that of another planet). The movement of charge between the Earth's surface, the atmosphere, and the ionosphere is known as the global atmospheric electrical circuit. Atmospheric electricity is an interdisciplinary topic with a long history, involving concepts from electrostatics, atmospheric physics, meteorology and Earth science.

Thunderstorms act as a giant battery in the atmosphere, charging up the electrosphere to about 400,000 volts with respect to the surface. This sets up an electric field throughout the atmosphere, which decreases with increase in altitude. Atmospheric ions created by cosmic rays and natural radioactivity move in the electric field, so a very small current flows through the atmosphere, even away from thunderstorms. Near the surface of the Earth, the magnitude of the field is on average around 100 V/m, oriented such that it drives positive charges down.

Atmospheric electricity involves both thunderstorms, which create lightning bolts to rapidly discharge huge amounts of atmospheric charge stored in storm clouds, and the continual electrification of the air due to ionization from cosmic rays and natural radioactivity, which ensure that the atmosphere is never quite neutral.

== History ==
Sparks drawn from electrical machines and from Leyden jars suggested to early experimenters Francis Hauksbee, Isaac Newton, Jean-Antoine Nollet, and Stephen Gray that lightning was caused by electric discharges. In 1708, Dr. William Wall was one of the first to observe that spark discharges resembled miniature lightning, after observing the sparks from a charged piece of amber.

Benjamin Franklin's experiments showed that electrical phenomena of the atmosphere were not fundamentally different from those produced in the laboratory, by listing many similarities between electricity and lightning. By 1749, Franklin observed lightning to possess almost all the properties observable in electrical machines.

In July 1750, Franklin hypothesized that electricity could be taken from clouds via a tall metal aerial with a sharp point. Before Franklin could carry out his experiment, in 1752 Thomas-François Dalibard erected a 40-foot (12 m) iron rod at Marly-la-Ville, near Paris, drawing sparks from a passing cloud. With ground-insulated aerials, an experimenter could bring a grounded lead with an insulated wax handle close to the aerial, and observe a spark discharge from the aerial to the grounding wire. In May 1752, Dalibard affirmed that Franklin's theory was correct.

Around June 1752, Franklin reportedly performed his famous kite experiment. The kite experiment was repeated by Romas, who drew from a metallic string sparks 9 feet (2.7 m) long, and by Tiberius Cavallo, who made many important observations on atmospheric electricity. L. G. Lemonnier (1752) also reproduced Franklin's experiment with an aerial, but substituted the ground wire with some dust particles (testing attraction). He went on to document the fair weather condition, the clear-day electrification of the atmosphere, and its diurnal variation. Giovanni Battista Beccaria (1775) confirmed Lemonnier's diurnal variation data and determined that the atmosphere's charge polarity was positive in fair weather. Horace-Bénédict de Saussure (1779) recorded data relating to a conductor's induced charge in the atmosphere. Saussure's instrument (which contained two small spheres suspended in parallel with two thin wires) was a precursor to the electrometer. Saussure found that the atmospheric electrification under clear weather conditions had an annual variation, and that it also varied with height. In 1785, Charles-Augustin de Coulomb discovered the electrical conductivity of air. His discovery was contrary to the prevailing thought at the time, that the atmospheric gases were insulators (which they are to some extent, or at least not very good conductors when not ionized). Paul Herman (1804) theorized that the Earth was negatively charged, and Jean Charles Athanase Peltier (1842) tested and confirmed Erman's idea.

Several researchers contributed to the growing body of knowledge about atmospheric electrical phenomena. Francis Ronalds began observing the potential gradient and air-earth currents around 1810, including making continuous automated recordings. He resumed his research in the 1840s as the inaugural Honorary Director of the Kew Observatory, where the first extended and comprehensive dataset of electrical and associated meteorological parameters was created. He also supplied his equipment to other facilities around the world with the goal of delineating atmospheric electricity on a global scale. Lord Kelvin's new water dropper collector and divided-ring electrometer were introduced at Kew Observatory in the 1860s, and atmospheric electricity remained a speciality of the observatory until its closure. For high-altitude measurements, kites were once used, and weather balloons or aerostats are still used, to lift experimental equipment into the air. Early experimenters even went aloft themselves in hot-air balloons.

H. H. Hoffert (1888) identified individual lightning downward strokes using early cameras. J. Elster and H. F. Geitel, who also worked on thermionic emission, proposed a theory to explain thunderstorms' electrical structure (1885) and, later, discovered atmospheric radioactivity (1899) from the existence of positive and negative ions in the atmosphere. Friedrich Carl Alwin Pockels (1897) estimated lightning current intensity by analyzing lightning flashes in basalt (c. 1900) and studying the left-over magnetic fields caused by lightning. Discoveries about the electrification of the atmosphere via sensitive electrical instruments and ideas on how the Earth's negative charge is maintained were developed mainly in the 20th century, with C.T.R. Wilson playing an important part. Current research on atmospheric electricity focuses mainly on lightning, particularly high-energy particles and transient luminous events, and the role of non-thunderstorm electrical processes in weather and climate.

== Description ==
Atmospheric electricity is always present, and during fine weather away from thunderstorms, the air above the surface of Earth is positively charged, while the Earth's surface charge is negative. This can be understood in terms of a difference of potential between a point of the Earth's surface, and a point somewhere in the air above it. Because the atmospheric electric field is negatively directed (meaning toward the ground) in fair weather, the convention is to refer to the potential gradient, which has the opposite sign (meaning the electrical potential increases with distance from the ground) and is about 100 V/m at the surface, at a distance from thunderstorms. There is a weak conduction current of atmospheric ions moving in the atmospheric electric field, about 2 picoamperes per square meter, and the air is weakly conductive due to the presence of these atmospheric ions.

=== Variations ===
Global daily cycles in the atmospheric electric field, with a minimum around 03 UT and peaking roughly 16 hours later, were researched by the Carnegie Institution of Washington in the 20th century. This Carnegie curve variation has been described as "the fundamental electrical heartbeat of the planet".

Even away from thunderstorms, atmospheric electricity can be highly variable, but, generally, the electric field is enhanced in fogs and dust whereas the atmospheric electrical conductivity is diminished.

=== Links with biology ===
The atmospheric potential gradient leads to an ion flow from the positively charged atmosphere to the negatively charged earth surface. Over a flat field on a day with clear skies, the atmospheric potential gradient is approximately 120 V/m. Objects protruding these fields, e.g. flowers and trees, can increase the electric field strength to several kilovolts per meter. These near-surface electrostatic forces are detected by organisms such as the bumblebee to navigate to flowers and the spider to initiate dispersal by ballooning. The atmospheric potential gradient is also thought to affect sub-surface electro-chemistry and microbial processes.

On the other hand, swarming insects and birds can be a source of biogenic charge in the atmosphere, likely contributing to a source of electrical variability in the atmosphere.

=== Near space ===
The electrosphere layer (from tens of kilometers above the surface of the Earth to the ionosphere) has a high electrical conductivity and is essentially at a constant electric potential. The ionosphere is the inner edge of the magnetosphere and is the part of the atmosphere that is ionized by solar radiation. (Photoionization is a physical process in which a photon is incident on an atom, ion or molecule, resulting in the ejection of one or more electrons.)

=== Cosmic radiation ===
The Earth, and almost all living things on it, are constantly bombarded by radiation from outer space. This radiation primarily consists of positively charged ions from protons to iron and larger nuclei derived sources outside the Solar System. This radiation interacts with atoms in the atmosphere to create an air shower of secondary ionising radiation, including X-rays, muons, protons, alpha particles, pions, and electrons. Ionization from this secondary radiation ensures that the atmosphere is weakly conductive, and the slight current flow from these ions over the Earth's surface balances the current flow from thunderstorms. Ions have characteristic parameters such as mobility, lifetime, and generation rate that vary with altitude.

=== Thunderstorms and lightning ===
The potential difference between the ionosphere and the Earth is maintained by thunderstorms, with lightning strikes delivering negative charges from the atmosphere to the ground.

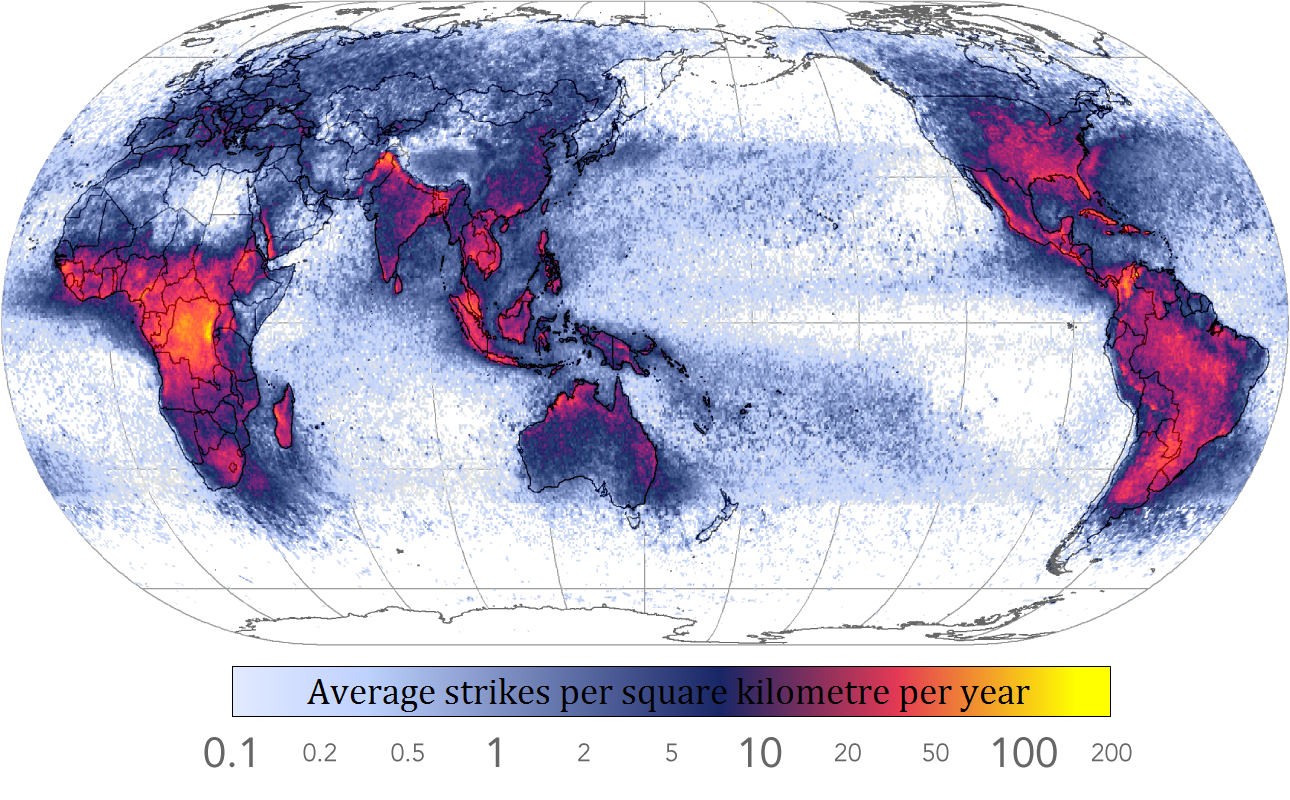
World map showing frequency of lightning strikes, in flashes per km^{2} per year (equal-area projection). Lightning strikes most frequently in the Democratic Republic of the Congo. Combined 1995–2003 data from the Optical Transient Detector and 1998–2003 data from the Lightning Imaging Sensor.

Collisions between ice and soft hail (graupel) inside cumulonimbus clouds causes separation of positive and negative charges within the cloud, essential for the generation of lightning. How lightning initially forms is still a matter of debate: Scientists have studied root causes ranging from atmospheric perturbations (wind, humidity, and atmospheric pressure) to the impact of solar wind and energetic particles.

An average bolt of lightning carries a negative electric current of 40 kiloamperes (kA) (although some bolts can be up to 120 kA), and transfers a charge of five coulombs and energy of 500 MJ, or enough energy to power a 100-watt lightbulb for just under two months. The voltage depends on the length of the bolt, with the dielectric breakdown of air being three million volts per meter, and lightning bolts often being several hundred meters long. However, lightning leader development is not a simple matter of dielectric breakdown, and the ambient electric fields required for lightning leader propagation can be a few orders of magnitude less than dielectric breakdown strength. Further, the potential gradient inside a well-developed return-stroke channel is on the order of hundreds of volts per meter or less due to intense channel ionization, resulting in a true power output on the order of megawatts per meter for a vigorous return-stroke current of 100 kA .

If the quantity of water that is condensed in and subsequently precipitated from a cloud is known, then the total energy of a thunderstorm can be calculated. In an average thunderstorm, the energy released amounts to about 10,000,000 kilowatt-hours (3.6×10^{13} joule), which is equivalent to a 20-kiloton nuclear warhead. A large, severe thunderstorm might be 10 to 100 times more energetic.

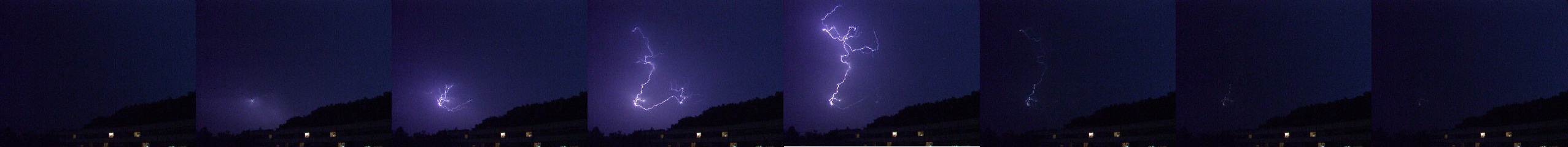
Lightning sequence (Duration: 0.32 seconds)

=== Corona discharges ===
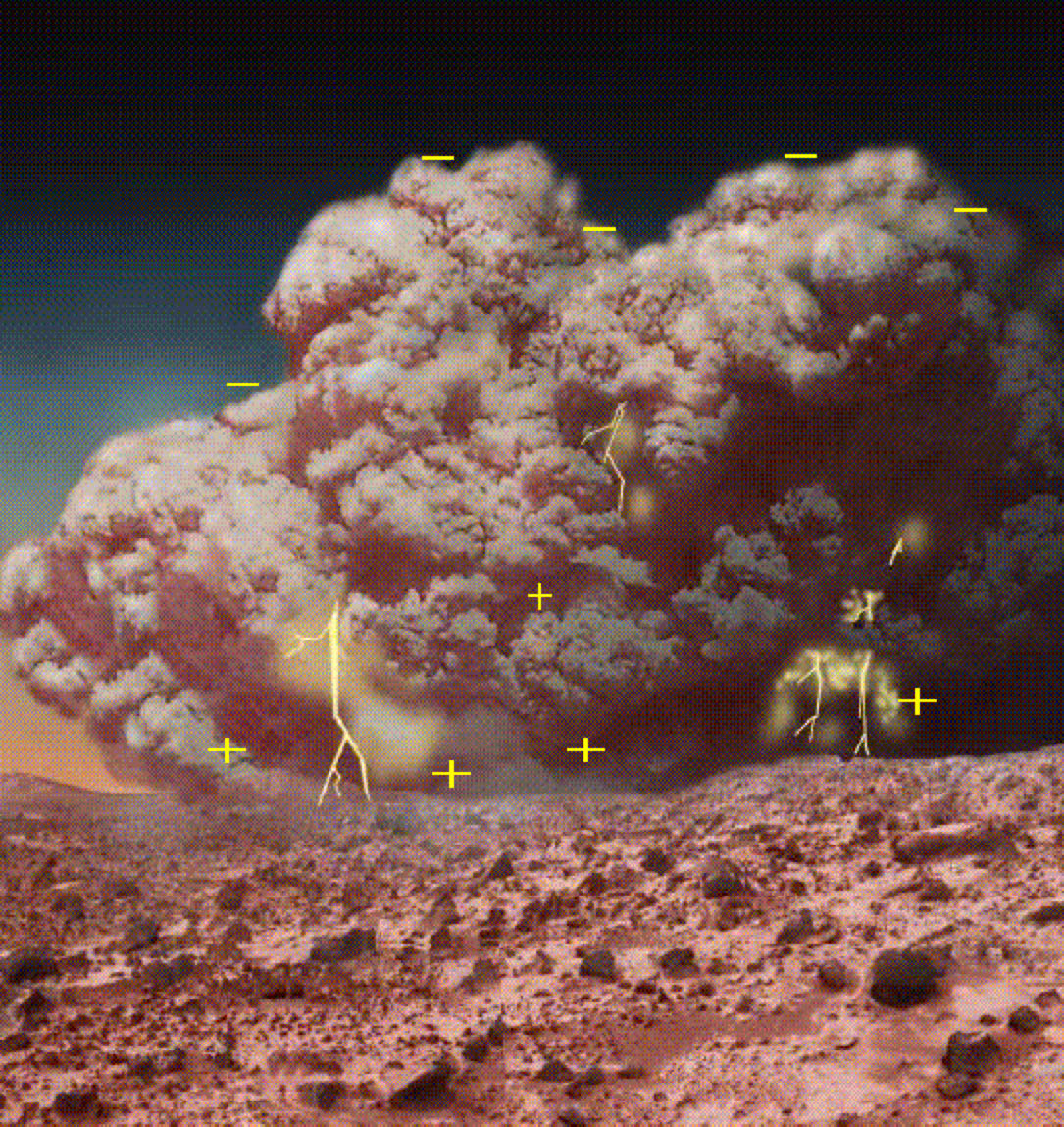
A depiction of atmospheric electricity in a Martian dust storm, which has been suggested as a possible explanation for enigmatic chemistry results from Mars (see also Viking lander biological experiments)

St. Elmo's Fire is an electrical phenomenon in which luminous plasma is created by a coronal discharge originating from a grounded object. Ball lightning is often erroneously identified as St. Elmo's Fire, whereas they are separate and distinct phenomena. Although referred to as "fire", St. Elmo's Fire is, in fact, plasma, and is observed, usually during a thunderstorm, at the tops of trees, spires or other tall objects, or on the heads of animals, as a brush or star of light.

Corona is caused by the electric field around the object in question ionizing the air molecules, producing a faint glow easily visible in low-light conditions. Approximately 1,000 – 30,000 volts per centimeter is required to induce St. Elmo's Fire; however, this is dependent on the geometry of the object in question. Sharp points tend to require lower voltage levels to produce the same result because electric fields are more concentrated in areas of high curvature, thus discharges are more intense at the end of pointed objects. St. Elmo's Fire and normal sparks both can appear when high electrical voltage affects a gas. St. Elmo's fire is seen during thunderstorms when the ground below the storm is electrically charged, and there is high voltage in the air between the cloud and the ground. The voltage tears apart the air molecules and the gas begins to glow. The nitrogen and oxygen in the Earth's atmosphere causes St. Elmo's Fire to fluoresce with blue or violet light; this is similar to the mechanism that causes neon signs to glow.

=== Earth-Ionosphere cavity ===
The Schumann resonances are a set of spectrum peaks in the extremely low frequency (ELF) portion of the Earth's electromagnetic field spectrum. Schumann resonance is due to the space between the surface of the Earth and the conductive ionosphere acting as a waveguide. The limited dimensions of the earth cause this waveguide to act as a resonant cavity for electromagnetic waves. The cavity is naturally excited by energy from lightning strikes.

=== Electrical system grounding ===
Atmospheric charges can cause undesirable, dangerous, and potentially lethal charge potential buildup in suspended electric wire power distribution systems. Bare wires suspended in the air spanning many kilometers and isolated from the ground can collect very large stored charges at high voltage, even when there is no thunderstorm or lightning occurring. This charge will seek to discharge itself through the path of least insulation, which can occur when a person reaches out to activate a power switch or to use an electric device.

To dissipate atmospheric charge buildup, one side of the electrical distribution system is connected to the earth at many points throughout the distribution system, as often as on every support pole. The one earth-connected wire is commonly referred to as the "protective earth", and provides path for the charge potential to dissipate without causing damage, and provides redundancy in case any one of the ground paths is poor due to corrosion or poor ground conductivity. The additional electric grounding wire that carries no power serves a secondary role, providing a high-current short-circuit path to rapidly blow fuses and render a damaged device safe, rather than have an ungrounded device with damaged insulation become "electrically live" via the grid power supply, and hazardous to touch.

Each transformer in an alternating current distribution grid segments the grounding system into a new separate circuit loop. These separate grids must also be grounded on one side to prevent charge buildup within them relative to the rest of the system, and which could cause damage from charge potentials discharging across the transformer coils to the other grounded side of the distribution network.

=== Magnetoplasmaionic Engine ===
Magnetoplasmaionic Engine (MPI Engine) is a conceptual propulsion system that combines atmosphere-breathing electric propulsion and plasma-based electromagnetic acceleration. The concept involves collecting atmospheric ions through corona discharge induced ionization, in which high-voltage electrodes generate localized electric fields that ionize surrounding gas molecules and enhance the concentration of charged particles. These ions are subsequently processed into a plasma and accelerated through electric and magnetic fields to generate thrust. A typical MPI Engine architecture includes a corona-discharge ion collection system, plasma ionization chamber, magnetic confinement coils, power conditioning electronics, and a magnetic nozzle. The concept is intended to investigate the utilization of ambient atmospheric particles as a supplementary propellant source for low-altitude spacecraft operations while reducing dependence on stored propellants.

== See also ==
General

- Atmospheric physics
- Ionosphere
- Air quality
- Lightning rocket

Electromagnetism

- Earth's magnetic field
- Sprites and lightning
- Whistler (radio)
- Telluric current

Other

- Electrodynamic tether
- Solar radiation

== References and external articles ==
=== Other reading ===
- Richard E. Orville (ed.), "Atmospheric and Space Electricity". ("Editor's Choice" virtual journal) – "American Geophysical Union". (AGU) Washington, DC 20009-1277 USA
- Schonland, B. F. J., "Atmospheric Electricity". Methuen and Co., Ltd., London, 1932.
- MacGorman, Donald R., W. David Rust, D. R. Macgorman, and W. D. Rust, "The Electrical Nature of Storms". Oxford University Press, March 1998. ISBN 0-19-507337-1
- Volland, H., "Atmospheric Electrodynamics", Springer, Berlin, 1984.
