= Electrical device =

Devices that use electricity for functioning

Electrical devices or electric devices are devices that functionally rely on electric energy (AC or DC) to operate their core parts (electric motors, transformers, lighting, rechargeable batteries, control electronics). They can be contrasted with traditional mechanical devices which depend on different power sources like fuels or human physical strength. Electronic devices are a specialized kind of electrical devices in which electric power is predominantly used for data processing rather than the generation of mechanical forces. To better differentiate between both classes, electric devices that emphasize physical work are also called electromechanical. Mechatronics accentuates the intersection of both fields.

Together, electronic and electric devices, their development, maintenance, and power supply comprise the subject of electrical engineering.

The majority of electric devices in households is stationary and — due to their considerable power consumption — relies on electrical installation, especially electric outlets instead of small electric generators, batteries, rechargeable or not.

Due to their dependence on electric power sources, in general well-evolved power grids, electric devices and their power consumption pattern have moved into the focus of smart metering.

== Electrical equipment ==
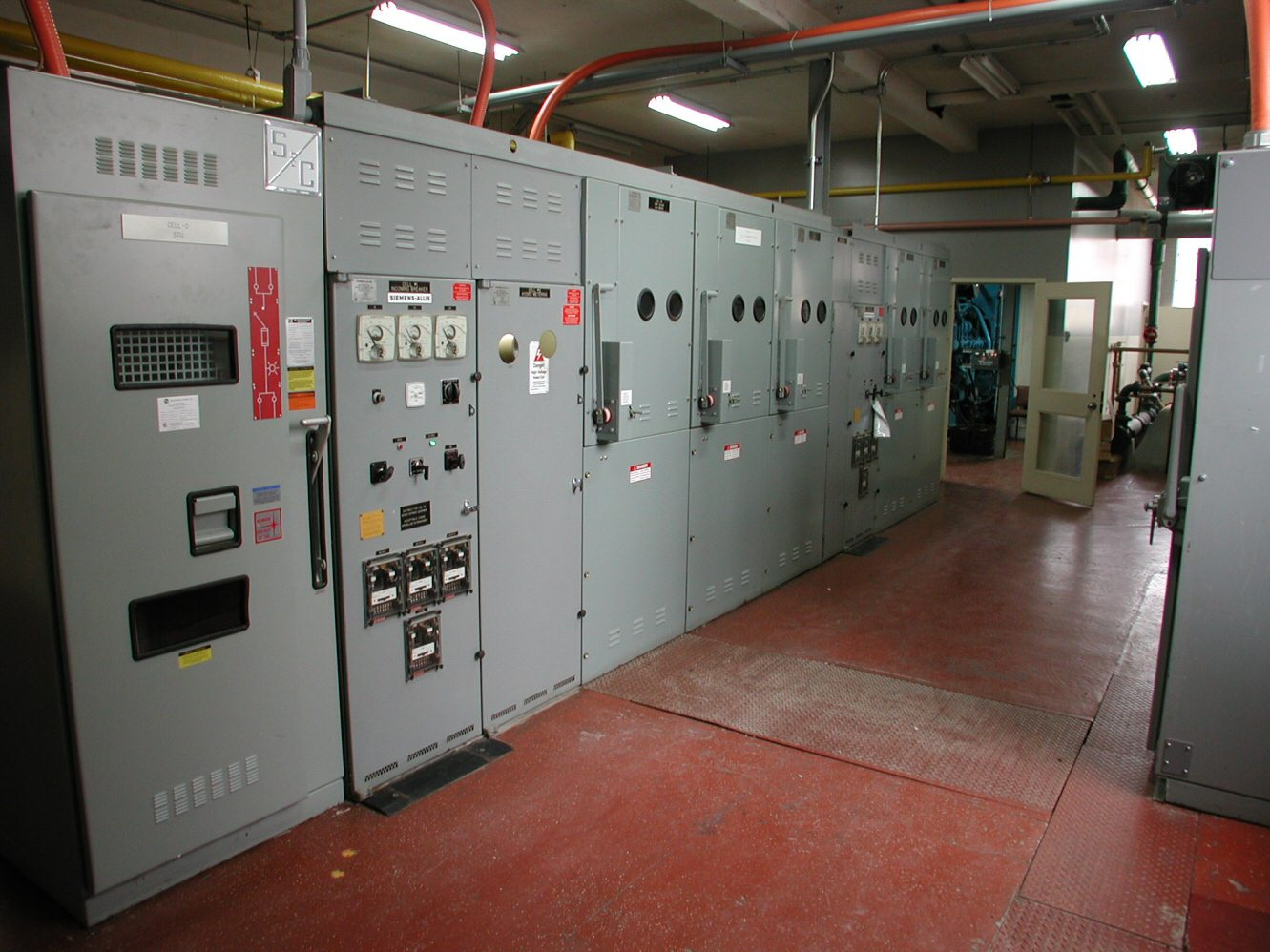
Electrical equipment part of the distribution system in a large building

Electrical equipment includes any machine powered by electricity. It usually consists of an enclosure, a variety of electrical components, and often a power switch. Examples of these include:

- Lighting
- Major appliance
- Small appliances
- IT equipment (computers, printers etc.)
- Motors, pumps and HVAC Systems

More specifically, electrical equipment refers to the individual components of an electrical distribution system. These components may involve:

- Electric switchboards
- Distribution boards
- Circuit breakers and disconnects
- Transformers
- Electricity meter

== See also ==
- Electrical equipment in hazardous areas
- Electrical equipment
- Home appliance
- Power transmission
- Electrical room
- Grounding kit
- List of largest manufacturing companies by revenue
- Grondzik, Walter T. (2010). Mechanical and electrical equipment for buildings (11 ed.). Wiley. ISBN 9780470195659.

== Literature ==
- Lindsay, J. F. (1986). Electromechanics and electrical machinery. Englewood Cliffs, N.J.: Prentice-Hall. ISBN 978-0132500937.
- Advanced electrical and electronic systems. NY RESEARCH PR. 2019. ISBN 978-1632386250.
- Miu, Denny K. (1993). Mechatronics : electromechanics and contromechanics. New York: Springer-Verlag. ISBN 978-0387978932.
