= Global atmospheric electrical circuit =

Continuous movement of charge carriers

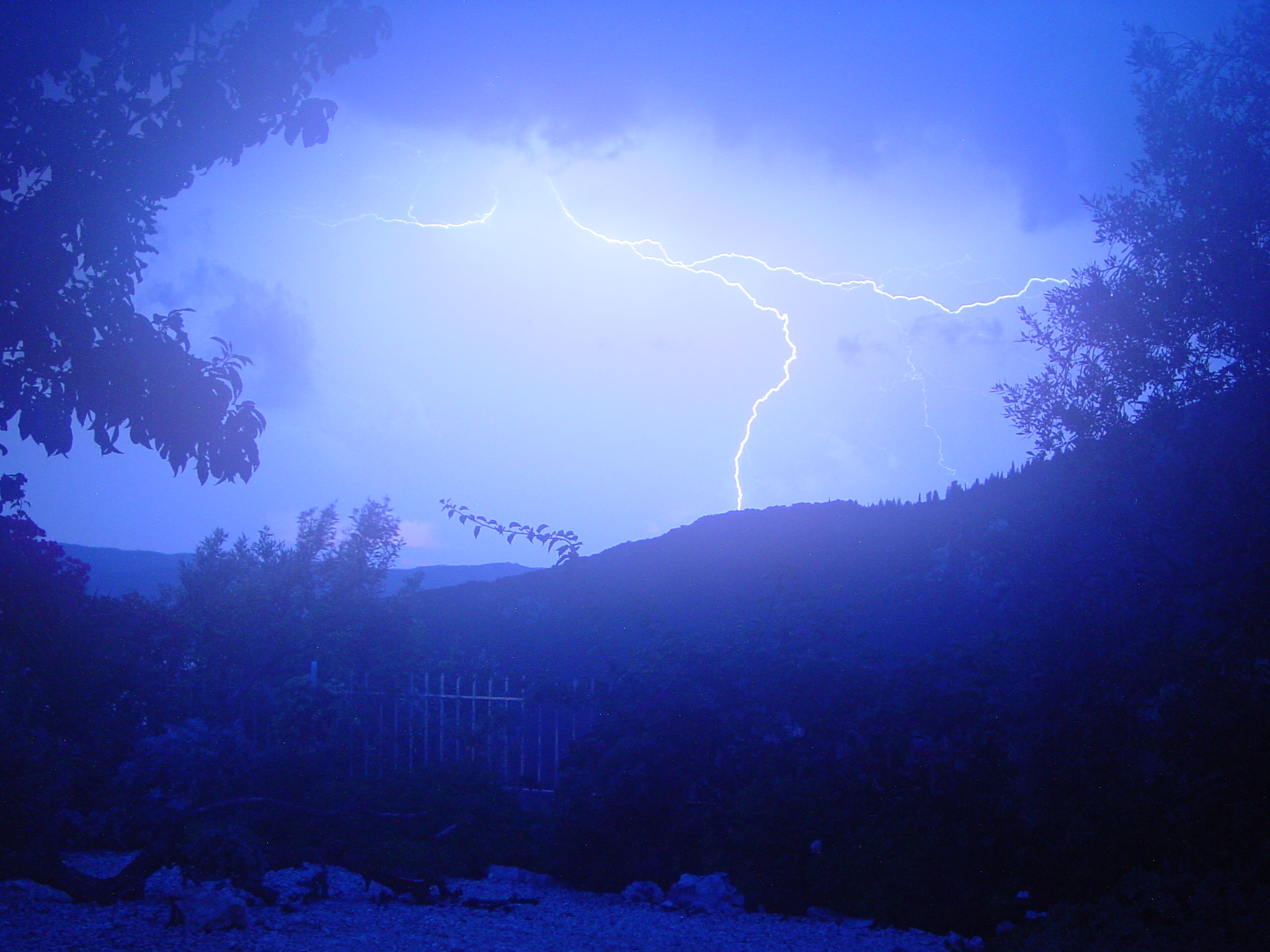
Lightning strikes the earth 100 times per second.

A global atmospheric electrical circuit is the continuous movement of atmospheric charge carriers, such as ions, between an upper conductive layer (often an ionosphere) and surface. The global circuit concept is closely related to atmospheric electricity, but not all atmospheres necessarily have a global electric circuit. The basic concept of a global circuit is that through the balance of thunderstorms and fair weather, the atmosphere is subject to a continual and substantial electrical current.

Principally, thunderstorms throughout the world carry negative charges to the ground, which is then discharged gradually through the air away from the storms, in conditions that are referred to as "fair weather".

This atmospheric circuit is central to the study of atmospheric physics and meteorology. The global electrical circuit is also relevant to the study of human health and air pollution, due to the interaction of ions and aerosols. The effects of climate change and temperature-sensitivity of the Earth's electrical circuit are currently unknown.

== History ==
The history of the global atmospheric electrical circuit is intertwined with the history of atmospheric electricity. For example, in the 18th century, scientists began understanding the link between lightning and electricity. In addition to the iconic kite experiments of Benjamin Franklin and Thomas-François Dalibard, some early studies of charge in a "cloudless atmosphere" (i.e. fair weather) were carried out by Giambatista Beccaria, John Canton, Louis-Guillaume Le Monnier and John Read.

Fair weather measurements from the late 18th century onwards often found consistent diurnal variations. During the 19th century, several long series of observations were made. Measurements near cities were (and still are) heavily influenced by smoke pollution. In the early 20th century, balloon ascents provided information about the electric field well above the surface. Important work was done by the research vessel Carnegie, which produced standardised measurements around the world's oceans (where the air is relatively clean).

C. T. R. Wilson was the first to present the concept of a global circuit in 1920.

== Mechanism ==
=== Lightning ===
There are about 40,000 thunderstorms per day across the globe, generating roughly 100 lightning strikes per second, which can be thought to charge the Earth like a battery. Thunderstorms generate an electrical potential difference between the Earth's surface and the ionosphere, mainly by means of lightning returning current to ground. Because of this, the ionosphere is positively charged relative to the ground. Consequently, there is always a small current of approximately 2pA per square metre transporting charged particles in the form of atmospheric ions between the ionosphere and the surface.

=== Fair weather ===
This current is carried by ions present in the atmosphere (generated mainly by cosmic rays in the free troposphere and above, and by radioactivity in the lowest 1 km or so). The ions make the air weakly conductive; different locations, and meteorological conditions have different electrical conductivity. Fair weather describes the atmosphere away from thunderstorms where this weak electrical current between the ionosphere and the ground flows.

== Measurement ==
The voltages involved in the Earth's circuit are significant. At sea level, the typical potential gradient in fair weather is 120 V/m. Nonetheless, since the conductivity of air is limited, the associated currents are also limited. A typical value is 1800 A over the entire planet. In fair weather, there are about 3.5 microamps per square kilometer (9 microamps per square mile).

=== Carnegie curve ===
The Earth's electrical current varies according to a daily pattern called the Carnegie curve, caused by the regular daily variations in atmospheric electrification associated with the Earth's stormy regions. The pattern also shows seasonal variation, linked to the Earth's solstices and equinoxes. It was named after the Carnegie Institution for Science.

== See also ==
- Atmospheric electricity
- Geophysics
- Earth's magnetic field
- Upper-atmospheric lightning
- Space charge
- Telluric currents

== External sources ==
=== Publications ===
- Le Monnier, L.-G.: "Observations sur l'Electricité de l'Air", Histoire de l'Académie royale des sciences (1752), pp. 233ff. 1752.
- Sven Israelsson, On the Conception Fair Weather Condition in Atmospheric Electricity. 1977.
- Ogawa, T., "Fair-weather electricity". J. Geophys. Res., 90, 5951–5960, 1985.
- Wåhlin, L., "Elements of fair weather electricity". J. Geophys. Res., 99, 10767-10772, 1994
- RB Bent, WCA Hutchinson, Electric space charge measurements and the electrode effect within the height of a 21 m mast. J. Atmos. Terr. Phys, 196.
- Bespalov P.A., Chugunov Yu. V. and Davydenko S.S., Planetary electric generator under fair-weather condition with altitude-dependent atmospheric conductivity, Journal of Atmospheric and Terrestrial Physics, v.58, #5, pp. 605–611,1996
- DG Yerg, KR Johnson, Short-period fluctuations in the fair weather electric field. J. Geophys. Res., 1974.
- T Ogawa, Diurnal variation in atmospheric electricity. J. Geomag. Geoelect, 1960.
- R Reiter, Relationships Between Atmospheric Electric Phenomena and Simultaneous Meteorological Conditions. 1960
- J. Law, The ionisation of the atmosphere near the ground in fair weather. Quarterly Journal of the Royal Meteorological Society, 1963
- T. Marshall, W.D. Rust, M. Stolzenburg, W. Roeder, P. Krehbim A study of enhanced fair-weather electric fields occurring soon after sunrise.
- R Markson, Modulation of the earth's electric field by cosmic radiation. Nature, 1981
- Clark, John Fulmer, The Fair Weather Atmospheric Electric Potential and its Gradient.
- P. A. Bespalov, Yu. V. Chugunov and S. S. Davydenko, Planetary electric generator under fair-weather conditions with altitude-dependent atmospheric conductivity.
- AM Selva, et al., A New Mechanism for the Maintenance of Fair Weather Electric Field and Cloud Electrification.
- M. J. Rycroft, S. Israelssonb and C. Pricec, The global atmospheric electric circuit, solar activity and climate change.
- A. Mary Selvam, A. S. Ramachandra Murty, G. K. Manohar, S. S. Kandalgaonkar, Bh. V.Ramana Murty, A New Mechanism for the Maintenance of Fair Weather Electric Field and Cloud Electrification. arXiv:physics/9910006
- Ogawa, Toshio, Fair-Weather electricity. Journal of Geophysical Research, Volume 90, Issue D4, pp. 5951–5960.
- An auroral effect on the fair weather electric field. Nature 278, 239–241 (15 March 1979); doi:10.1038/278239a0
- Bespalov, P. A.; Chugunov, Yu. V., Plasmasphere rotation and origin of atmospheric electricity. Physics – Doklady, Volume 39, Issue 8, August 1994, pp. 553–555
- Bespalov, P. A.; Chugunov, Yu. V.; Davydenko, S. S. Planetary electric generator under fair-weather conditions with altitude-dependent atmospheric conductivity. Journal of Atmospheric and Terrestrial Physics.
- A.J. Bennett, R.G. Harrison, A simple atmospheric electrical instrument for educational use
