= Diurnal =

Diurnal ("daily") may refer to:

== General ==
- Diurnal cycle, any pattern that recurs daily
  - Diurnality, the behavior of animals and plants that are active in the daytime
- Diurnal phase shift, a phase shift of electromagnetic signals
- Diurnal temperature variation, a cycle of daily temperature change

== Astronomy ==
- Diurnal arc, the time (expressed in right ascension) that it takes a planet etc. to move from its rising to its setting point
- Diurnal motion, the apparent motion of stars around the Earth

== Astrology ==
- Diurnal chart, a chart for a given date, based on the natal chart
- Diurnal planet, a planet in a sect for which the Sun is above the horizon

== See also ==
- Salisbury Diurnal
