= Downlead =

A downlead is an electrical cable connecting an outdoor structure to an indoor or in-ground structure. In particular, it may refer to:

- Drop (telecommunication), the wire connecting an outdoor (particularly roof-mounted) antenna to the interior
- The wires in a lightning protection system, which connect the lightning rods to the grounding rods
