= Lightning rod fashion =

Fashion accessories using lightning rods

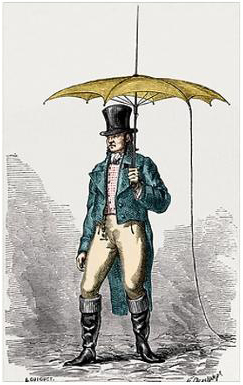
Lightning rod umbrella

Lightning rod fashion was a fad in late eighteenth-century Europe after the lightning rod, invented by Benjamin Franklin, was introduced. Lightning rod hats for ladies and lightning umbrellas for gentlemen were most popular in France, especially in Paris. The concept that inspired the fashion was that a lightning bolt would strike the Franklin-designed protective device instead of the person, and then the electricity would travel down a small metal chain into the ground harmlessly. The technology was already used to some extent in France to protect wooden buildings, and was therefore an accepted science concept that developed into a temporary fashion.

== Background ==
The lightning rod, invented by Franklin in the mid-eighteenth century to protect wooden structures, did not become commonplace in the United States until the nineteenth century, over fifty years after he first unveiled the concept. However, his experiments made electricity a fashionable topic in European society.

== Fashion styles ==
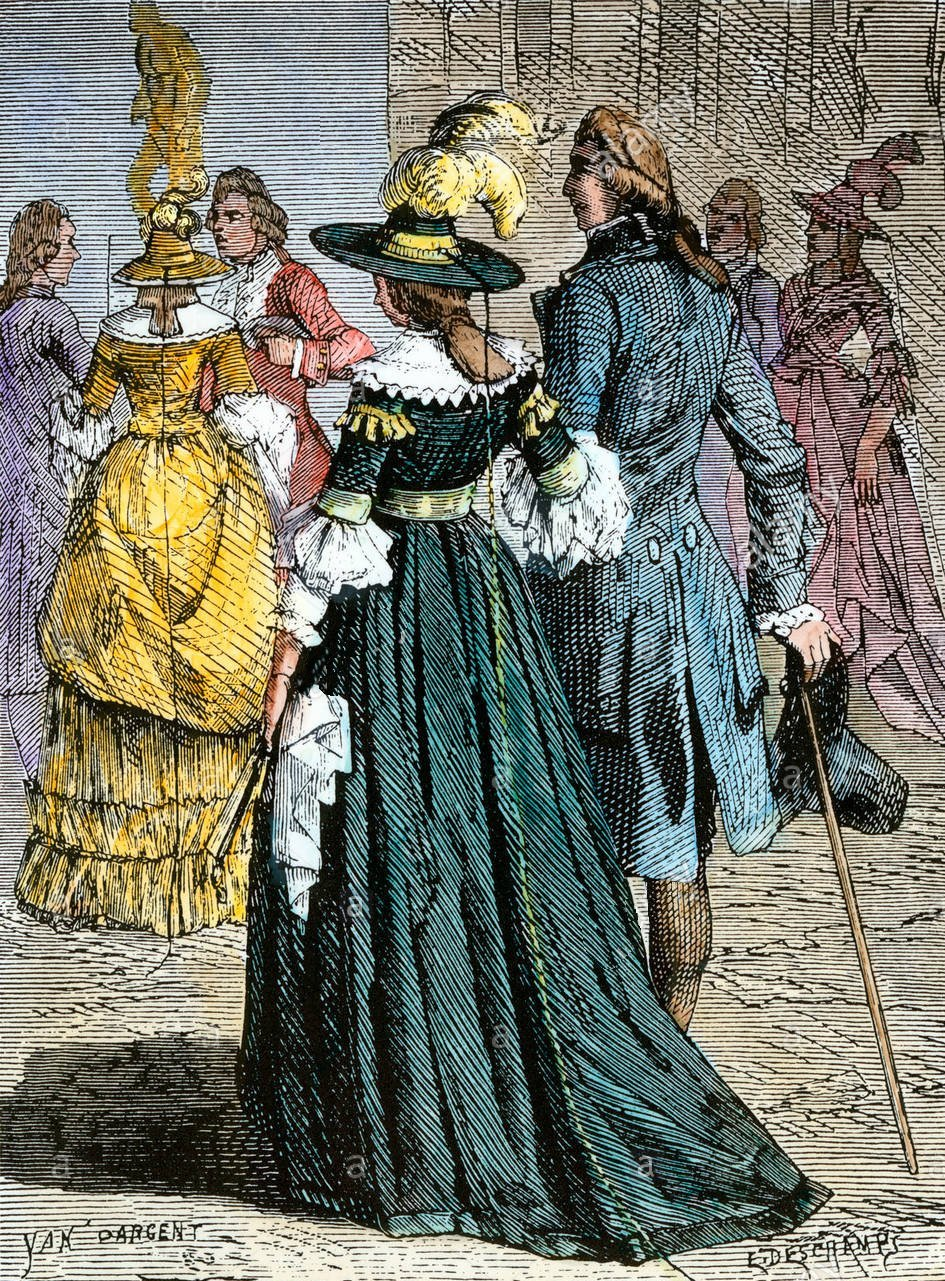
Lady's lightning rod hat

In 1778, experiments were performed testing the concept of placing a lightning rod above a person's head, in an accessory, to protect them from lightning strikes. A woven metal ribbon was placed around a lady's hat, and a small chain made of silver was attached to the ribbon. The chain was meant to run down the back of the lady's dress and drag on the ground. The electricity of a lightning strike to the ribbon would theoretically travel down the chain and into the ground, thus protecting the wearer of the hat. The supposed protection that this type of hat offered made it a popular Paris fashion trend in 1778. The lightning hat was called le chapeau paratonnerre in French.

A gentleman's 1778 version of the lightning hat involved an umbrella with a tip extended into a pointed rod. A metal chain ran from the rod over the exterior of the open umbrella and down onto the ground, thus providing a conduit for the lightning to follow. In French, the lightning umbrella was called le parapluie-paratonnerre.

The French physician and writer Claude Jean Veau Delaunay demonstrated a portable, telescoping lightning rod that was 6 metres (20 feet) long when fully extended. This was intended for use by people in open areas, such as a farmers in their fields.

In the humorous play Le Palais de Cristal ou les Parisiens à Londres ('The Crystal Palace or the Parisians in London'), written on the occasion of the Great Exhibition 1851 by Clairville and Éléonore Tenaille de Vaulabelle (under the pseudonym Jules Cordier), there is a scene presenting a version of the lightning hat (chapeau paratonnerre) as a "Chinese invention".

== Sources ==
- Bureaux (1895). Le Photo-journal. Bureaux.
- Camenzind, Hans (1 February 2007). Much Ado about Almost Nothing. Hans Camenzind. ISBN 978-0-615-13995-1.
- Clairville; Cordier, Jules (1851). Le Palais de Cristal ou les Parisiens à Londres. Beck. p. 31.
- Dray, Philip (2 August 2005). Stealing God's Thunder. Random House Publishing Group. ISBN 978-1-58836-461-6.
- Figuier, Louis (1867). The wonders of science or popular description of modern inventions. Furne, Juvet.
- O'Reilly, James (27 December 2011). Travelers' Tales Paris. Travelers' Tales. ISBN 978-1-60952-074-8. "Benjamin Franklin's discovery of atmospheric electricity did not give birth to a new French hairdress, but he was honored with a hat,"le chapeau paratonnerre," with a little metal chain to attract lightning extending from the back of the hatband."
- Schiffer, Michael Brian (14 October 2003). Draw the Lightning Down. University of California Press. p. 190. ISBN 978-0-520-23802-2. "Public discussions of lightning conductors in France also took a more whimsical turn. If buildings could be protected from lightning, then why not people as well? In 1778 it was proposed that hats be equipped with lightning conductors. From a metal ring around the hat, a chain would dangle downward dragging on the ground behind the wearer of this most fashionable contrivance of millinery artistry."
- Société française des électriciens (1936). Bulletin. "En 1778, on voit apparaître à Paris la mode du chapeau paratonnerre pour les femmes; .. = In 1778, the fashion of the lightning rod hat for women appeared in Paris..."
- Wilson, Mitchell A. (1960). American Science and Invention, a Pictorial History: The Fabulous Story of how American Dreamers, Wizards, and Inspired Tinkerers Converted a Wilderness Into the Wonder of the World. Bonanza Books.
