= Giovanni Battista Beccaria =

Italian physicist

Doctor Giovanni Battista Beccaria FRS
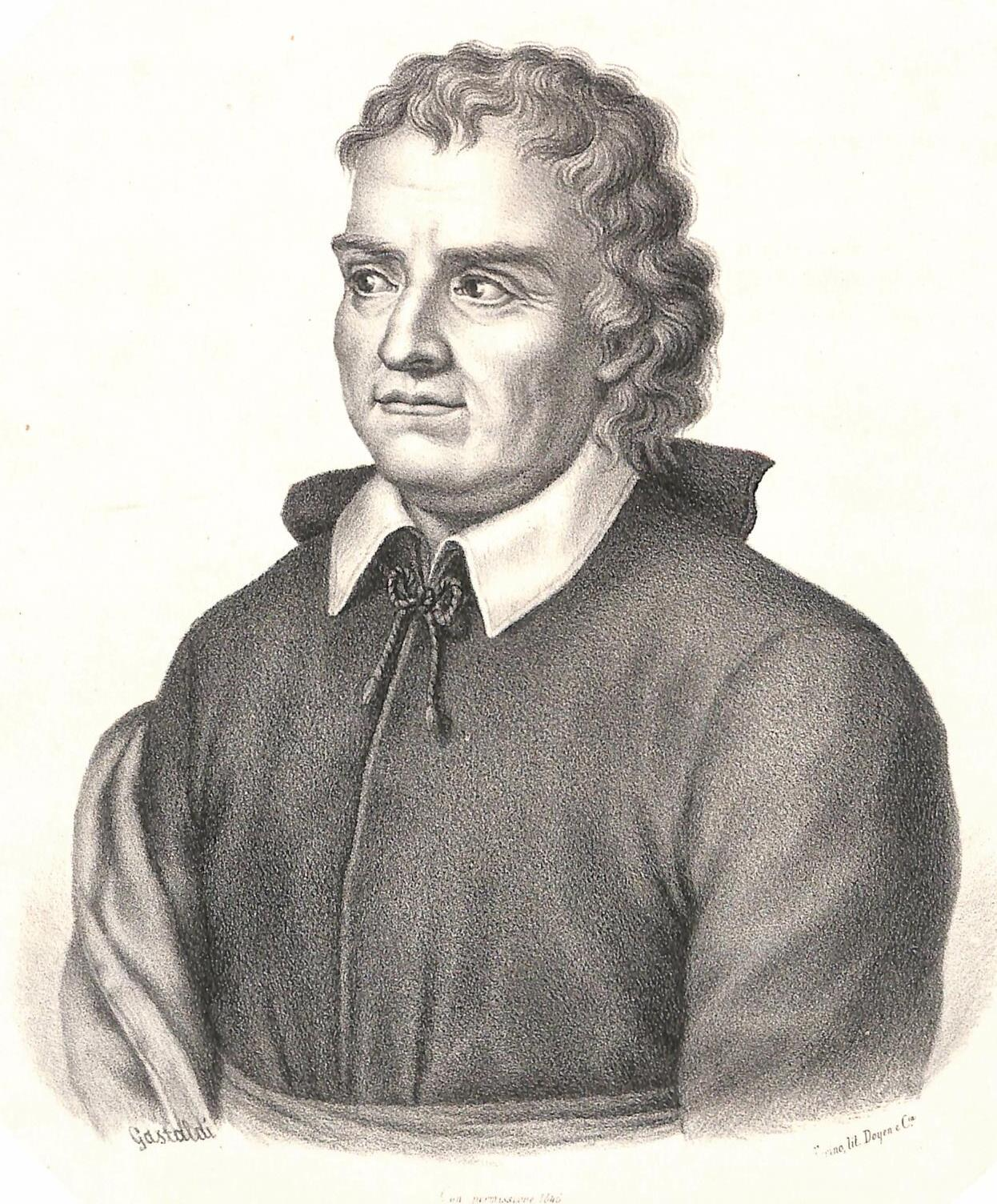
- Beccaria by Andrea Gastaldi, 1845
- Born: Francesco Ludovico Beccaria; 3 October 1716; Mondovì, Duchy of Savoy
- Died: 27 May 1781 (aged 64); Turin, Kingdom of Sardinia
- Known for: Elettricismo artificiale e naturale libri due
- Parent(s): Giovanni Battista Beccaria; Anna Maria Ingalis
- Scientific career
- Fields: Experimental physics
- Institutions: University of Turin
- Notable students: Joseph-Louis Lagrange; Antonio Vassalli Eandi

Ecclesiastical career
- Religion: Christianity
- Church: Catholic Church
- Ordained: November 1734

Giovanni Battista Beccaria (Italian: [bekkaˈriːa]; 3 October 1716 – 27 May 1781) was an Italian physicist. A fellow of the Royal Society, he published several papers on electrical subjects in the Phil. Trans. Beccaria was one of Benjamin Franklin's more conspicuous correspondents. His students included Joseph-Louis Lagrange, Giovanni Francesco Cigna, Giuseppe Angelo Saluzzo, and the successor to the Chair of physics, Antonio Vassalli Eandi; moreover, his researches inspired the physicists of Pavia, Alessandro Volta and Luigi Galvani.

Beccaria did much, in the way both of experiment and exposition, to spread knowledge of the electrical researches of Benjamin Franklin and others. In 1753, he published an important treatise on electricity, Elettricismo artificiale e naturale libri due, which was translated into English thanks to Franklin's interest. His contributions include a classification of luminous discharges, the collection of data on atmospheric electricity, and the design of the electrical thermometer, whose invention is usually wrongly ascribed to Franklin's colleague, Ebenezer Kinnersley. Franklin noted in a letter to Cadwallader Colden that "he (Beccaria) seems a Master of Method, and has reduc'd to systematic Order the scatter'd Experiments and Positions deliver'd in my Papers." Joseph Priestley (in his History and Present State of Electricity) declared Beccaria the "great Italian genius" who had "far surpassed everything done by French and English electricians."

== Life and works ==
Beccaria was born at Mondovì, near Turin, on 3 October 1716. In 1732, at the age of sixteen, he entered the Order of the Pious Schools or Piarists, and changed his baptismal name Francesco Ludovico into Giambattista. He studied in the schools of the order at Rome and at Narni. From 1737 to 1744 he taught grammar and rhetoric in Urbino and Palermo. At the same time, he applied himself with success to mathematics.

In 1744 he was appointed professor of philosophy at the college of S. Pantaleo in Rome. In 1748 he was appointed to the professor of physics at the University of Turin, where he introduced the experimental method, in contrast with the Cartesianism of his predecessors. He was afterwards made tutor to the young princes de Chablais and de Carignan, and continued to reside principally at Turin during the remainder of his life.

In Turin Beccaria ardently devoted himself to research on atmospheric electricity, in which he made liberal use of kites, rockets, and iron wire for the purpose of exploring the electrical conditions of the atmosphere. Henley's pith-ball electroscope was his recording instrument. In broken or stormy weather, positive and negative electrification were detected; whereas in calm, serene weather "the excessive or positive was always found". The sinuous or forked character of lightning was attributed to the resistance of the air; and the rupture of the shoes of a man struck by a flash, to the "moisture of the feet flying into vapour".

Beccaria confirmed the observation of Andrew Gordon that water evaporates more rapidly when electrified. He was also among the first to recognize and clearly state that the electrical charge on a conductor is confined to the surface. An experimental demonstration of this law of electrostatics was devised by Cavendish in 1775 and independently by Coulomb in 1788 and popularized in 1816 by Biot, whose name it usually bears. Beccaria adopted the two-fluid theory of Franklin as well as the views of the American philosopher on the preventive and protective functions of lightning conductors.

Beccaria confirmed Franklin's discovery that pointed metal rods could discharge electricity in the air, which eventually led to such rods being attached to buildings for the protection in an electrical storm of individuals on the ground. Charles Emmanuel III, was so impressed that he asked Beccaria to install a lightning rod on the Royal Palace of Turin.

In May 1755 Beccaria was elected Fellow of the Royal Society of London, and in 1766 he contributed a paper to the Philosophical Transactions, in which he describes (in Latin) five of the more important of his experimental researches. In 1770 he contributed a second paper (also in Latin) in which he expounds five theorems followed by fifteen corollaries in electrostatics. In 1759, King Charles Emmanuel III of Sardinia employed him to measure the degree of meridian arc in Piedmont. Beccaria died in Turin on 27 May 1781.

== Works ==
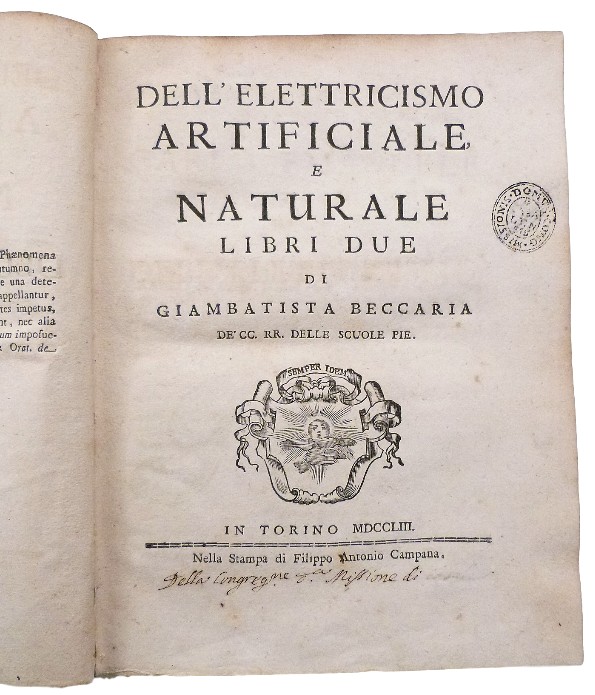
Title page of Beccaria's Dell’elettricismo artificiale, Turin, 1753

Beccaria did much, in the way both of experiment and exposition, to spread a knowledge of Franklin's electrical researches. His main work is his treatise Dell'elettricismo artificiale e naturale (1753), which was translated into English in 1778. Franklin considered Dell'elettricismo «one of the best pieces on the subject . . . in any language.»

In 1758 he published the Lettere sull'elettricismo, a treatise on electricity in the form of sixteen letters to the chemist Jacopo Bartolomeo Beccari. The work was held in high regard by Priestley, who considered it Becaria's finest achievement.

Other works are Experimenta atque observationes quibus electricitas vindex late constituitur (1769); and Dell'elettricità terrestre atmosferica a cielo sereno (1775), the first extended treatise on the subject of atmospheric electricity.

== Selected works ==
- Dell'elettricismo naturale e artificiale (in Italian). Turin: Filippo Antonio Campana. 1753.
- Dell'elettricismo (in Italian). Bologna. 1758.
- Experimenta atque observationes quibus electricitatis vindex late constituitur atque explicatur (in Latin). Turin: ex Typographia Regia. 1769.
- Elettricismo artificiale (in Italian). Turin: Stamperia reale. 1772.
- Gradus Taurinensis (in Latin). Turin: Stamperia reale. 1774.
- Della elettricità terrestre atmosferica a cielo sereno (in Italian). Torino. 1775.
- Lettere di un Italiano ad un Parigino intorno alle riflessioni del sig. Cassini de Thury sul grado torinese (in Italian). Florence: Gaetano Cambiagi. 1777.

=== In translation ===
- A Treatise Upon Artificial Electricity. London: J. Nourse, bookseller to his Majesty. 1776.
