= Antonio Vassalli Eandi =

Italian abbot, physicist, mathematician and teacher (1761–1825)

Doctor Antonio Vassalli Eandi
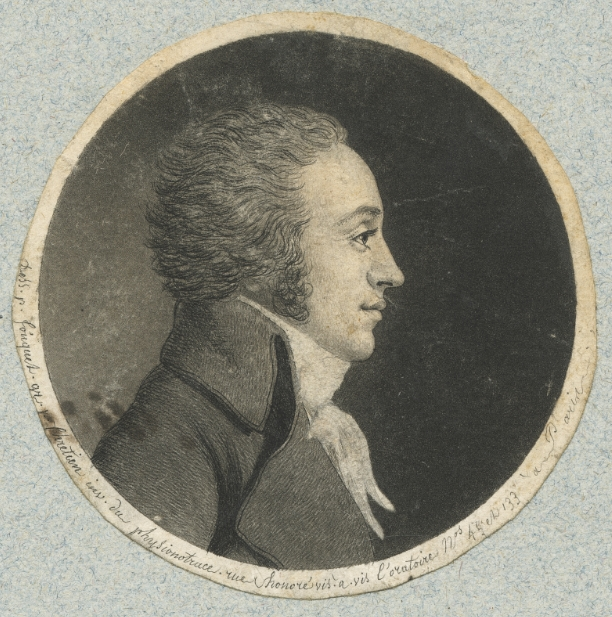
- Antonio Vassalli Eandi
- Born: Giuseppe Antonio Eandi; 30 January 1761; Turin, Kingdom of Sardinia
- Died: 5 July 1825 (aged 64); Turin, Kingdom of Sardinia
- Parent(s): Andrea Valeriano Eandi; Antonietta Garetti
- Scientific career
- Fields: Experimental physics
- Institutions: University of Turin
- Academic advisors: Giovanni Battista Beccaria

Ecclesiastical career
- Religion: Christianity
- Church: Catholic Church
- Ordained: 1784

Antonio Maria Vassalli Eandi (January 30, 1761 – July 5, 1825) was an Italian abbot, physicist, mathematician and teacher. He was a pupil of the physics professor Giovanni Battista Beccaria. Vassalli Eandi wrote on a range of topics including meteorology, plants, and electricity.

== Life and work ==
Vassalli was born in Saluzzo where, orphaned at a young age, he was cared for by his maternal uncle abbot Giuseppe Eandi of Savigliano - Saluzzo, a professor of physics at the University of Turin. His father, a notary, was Andrea Valeriano while his mother was Antonietta Garetti. After the death of his uncle, he added the surname Eandi.

In 1753, abbot I. Butis who taught him philosophy suggested that he applied for a sponsored college admission and he came out first in 1756 despite a stammer. He too joined the priestly order at the age of 23 and began to work on translations of mathematical works from English along with Giovanni Battista Beccaria. After Beccaria's death, he became an adjunct professor (ordinarius in 1801), working on electricity, galvanism, physics and mathematics.

In 1799 he was part of the Piedmontese representation on the Commission of Weights and Measures in Paris. He joined the council of the University of Turin in 1805, becoming a director of the observatory the next year where he began to study meteorology. He became a secretary at the Academy of Sciences in 1804 and a perpetual secretary in 1815. He published the work of the observatory from 1757 to 1817. He examined the use of lightning conductors, electrometers and the conductivity of metals.

He also took an interest in agriculture, conducting studies on groundnut cultivation and sericulture. From 1823 he was involved in organizing the Egyptian Museum and here he began to examine the properties of the hairs of mummies. Eandi was noted as an excellent teacher. He died in Turin on July 5, 1825.

== Bibliography ==
- Baldini, Ugo (1993). "EANDI, Giuseppe Antonio". Dizionario Biografico degli Italiani (in Italian). Vol. 42: Dugoni–Enza. Rome: Istituto dell'Enciclopedia Italiana. ISBN 978-88-12-00032-6.
