= Ebenezer Kinnersley =

English scientist (1711–1778)

- Born: 30 November 1711; Gloucester, England
- Died: 4 July 1778 (aged 66); Philadelphia, Pennsylvania, U.S.
- Citizenship: United States
- Known for: Electricity
- Scientific career
- Fields: Physics

Ebenezer Kinnersley (30 November 1711 – 4 July 1778) was an English scientist, inventor and lecturer, specializing in the investigation of electricity.

== Life and scientific studies ==
Ebenezer Kinnersley was a son of Rev. William Kinnersley, an assistant pastor of the Lower Dublin Baptist church. Ebenezer became a member of this church while young, and in 1743 was ordained as a minister, but he never served as a pastor. He travelled to America with his parents in 1714. His early life was passed in Dublin, and then he went to Philadelphia, where he gave evidence of his genius as a scholar and mechanician. It is supposed that he taught a school there and associated with Benjamin Franklin, who soon learned to appreciate young Kinnersley, whom he designates as "an ingenious neighbor."

When Franklin saw Dr Spence, a Scotsman in Boston, experiment with a glass tube and silk, and observed the effects that were produced, he communicated the fact to his associates in Philadelphia, and soon a hundred tubes were in use. Among those who devoted special attention to the subject were Franklin, Kinnersley, Philip Syng, and Thomas Hopkinson. Kinnersley devoted all his time to the subject, and in a couple of years the discoveries that were made were such as to astound the learned of Europe, to whom they were communicated by Franklin in his letters to the well-known Peter Collinson, of London, by whom they were published. It was thus that "The Philadelphia experiments" became known and the names of Franklin and Kinnersley were prominently associated with them and the discoveries that were made.

The "electric fire," as it was then termed, was a subject that engrossed scientific scholars in England and on the continent of Europe, but the Philadelphia philosophers appeared to surpass all in their discoveries. In 1748, Kinnersley demonstrated that the electric fluid actually passed through water, and proved it by a trough ten feet long full of water. He also invented the "magical picture" referred to by the Abbé Nollet, and produced the ringing of chimes of bells. In 1751 he began delivering lectures on "The Newly Discovered Electrical Fire" — the first of the kind in America or Europe. His advertisement in the "Pennsylvania Gazette" of 11 April 1751, is as follows: "Notice is hereby given to the Curious, that Wednesday next, Mr. Kinnersley proposes to begin a course of experiments on the newly discovered Electrical Fire, containing not only the most curious of those that have been made and published in Europe, but a considerable number of new ones lately made in this city, to be accompanied with methodical Lectures on the nature and properties of that wonderful element." These lectures proved a complete success, and were attended by persons of all classes.

In September 1751, he went to Boston with a letter from Franklin to Governor James Bowdoin, and delivered his lectures in Faneuil Hall. The governor said they "were pleasing to all sorts of people and were very curious." While at Boston, Kinnersley continued his experiments and discovered the difference between the electricity that was produced by the glass and sulphur globes, which he at once communicated to Franklin at Philadelphia. Until then the theory of Du Fay as to the vitreous and resinous electricity was generally adopted, but now Kinnersley showed beyond a doubt that the positive and negative theory was correct.

From Boston, Kinnersley went to Newport, Rhode Island, and, in March 1752, repeated his lectures there and suggested how houses and barns might be protected from lightning. This was three months before the time that Franklin drew the electricity from the clouds. He then visited New York and lectured on the subject. In 1753, Kinnersley was elected chief master in the College of Philadelphia, and in 1755 he was appointed professor of English and oratory, holding the office until 1772, when, owing to failing health, he resigned.

Kinnersley continued his experiments, invented an electrical thermometer, and proved that heat could be produced by electricity, which was not known before.

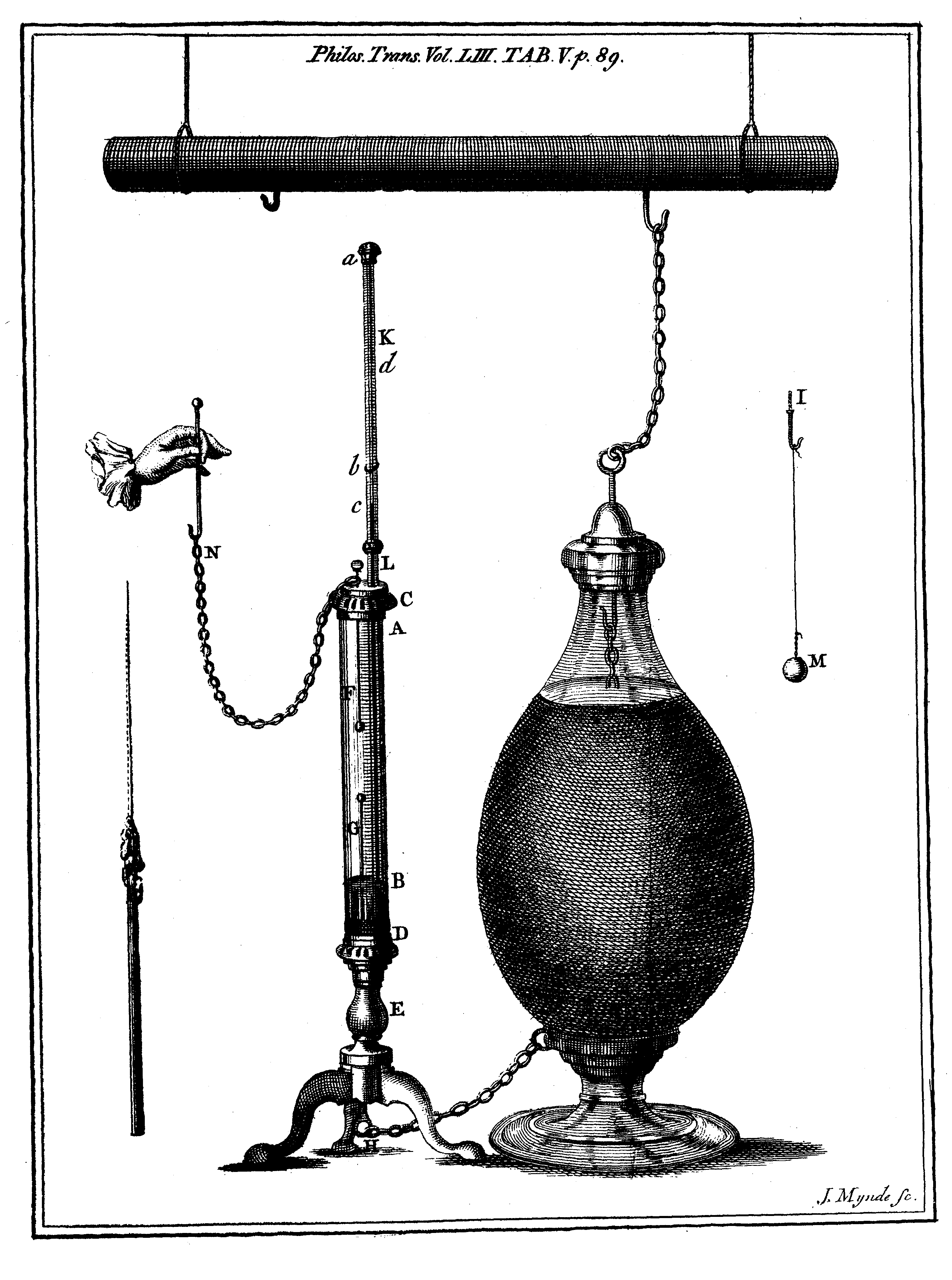
Kinnersley Electrical Air Thermometer circa 1763 and earlier described in 1761 letter from Benjamin Franklin

In 1764, he published a syllabus of his lectures on electricity, a copy of which is in the Philadelphia Public Library. This pamphlet gave in detail most of the experiments that he performed, among others an orrery propelled by electricity; and he suggested that perhaps the Solar System might be sustained in the same way. In the United States, he was better known than Franklin, and even in Europe his name was very frequently mentioned, as may be seen in Joseph Priestley's History of Electricity, and in a volume published by the Abbé Beccaria of the University of Turin.

He was elected to the revived American Philosophical Society in 1768, and the degree of M.A. was conferred upon him by the College of Philadelphia.

== Memorials ==
There is a window in his memory at the University of Pennsylvania.

Online Cemetery Memorial in Philadelphia

== See also ==
- Archibald Spencer
