= John Read (inventor) =

British Inventor

John Read (1726 – 1814) was a British physicist and inventor. He developed a rotating doubler electrostatic generator, used to produce static electricity, which he called a 'spectacle doubler' because it involved discs of glass. His work was based on William Nicholson's doubler.

Born in Lancashire, Reid lived at No. 10 Parkside in Knightsbridge, London and taught at the Knightsbridge Charity School.

He made observations of the atmospheric electric field, which he observed behaved differently in different air quality conditions, in 1791 and 1792. This phenomenon is now understood as originating from the global electric circuit.

Richard Lovett was the first British academic to publish Read's letters after his death.

== See also ==
- Tiberius Cavallo
- Jean Nicolas Pierre Hachette
- Charles Bernard Desormes
