= Lightning rocket =

Rocket used to trigger lightning

A lightning rocket is a rocket that unravels a conductor, such as a fine copper wire, as it ascends, to conduct lightning charges to the ground. Lightning strikes derived from this process are called "triggered lightning."

== Design ==
A conducting lightning rod is grounded and positioned alongside the launch tube in communication with the conductive path to thereby control the time and location of a lightning strike from the thundercloud. The conductor trailed by the rocket can be either a physical wire, or column of ionized gas produced by the engine. A lightning rocket using solid propellant may have cesium salts added, which produces a conductive path when the exhaust gases are discharged from the rocket. In a liquid propellant rocket a solution of calcium chloride is used to form the conductive path.

The system consists of a specially designed launch pad with lightning rods and conductors attached. The launch pad is either controlled wirelessly or via pneumatic line to the control station to prevent the discharge traveling to the control equipment. The fine copper wire (more recently reinforced with kevlar) is attached to the ground and plays out from the rocket as it ascends. The initial strike follows this wire and is as a result unusually straight. As the wire is vaporized by the initial strike, subsequent strikes are more angular in nature and follow the ionization trail of the initial strike. Rockets of this type are used for both lightning research and lightning control.

== Betts system ==
The Betts lightning rocket, patented by Robert E. Betts in 2003, consists of a rocket launcher that is in communication with a detection device that measures the presence of electrostatic and ionic change in close proximity to the rocket launcher that also fires the rocket. This system is designed to control the time and the location of a lightning strike. As the rocket flies to the thundercloud a liquid is expelled aft forming a column in the air of particles that are more electrically conductive than the surrounding air. In a similar fashion to the system employing a solid propellant as the conductive producer this conductive path conducts a lightning strike to ground to thereby control the time and location of a lightning strike from the thundercloud.
