= Lightning rod =

Metal rod intended to protect a structure from a lightning strike

Diagram of a simple lightning protection system

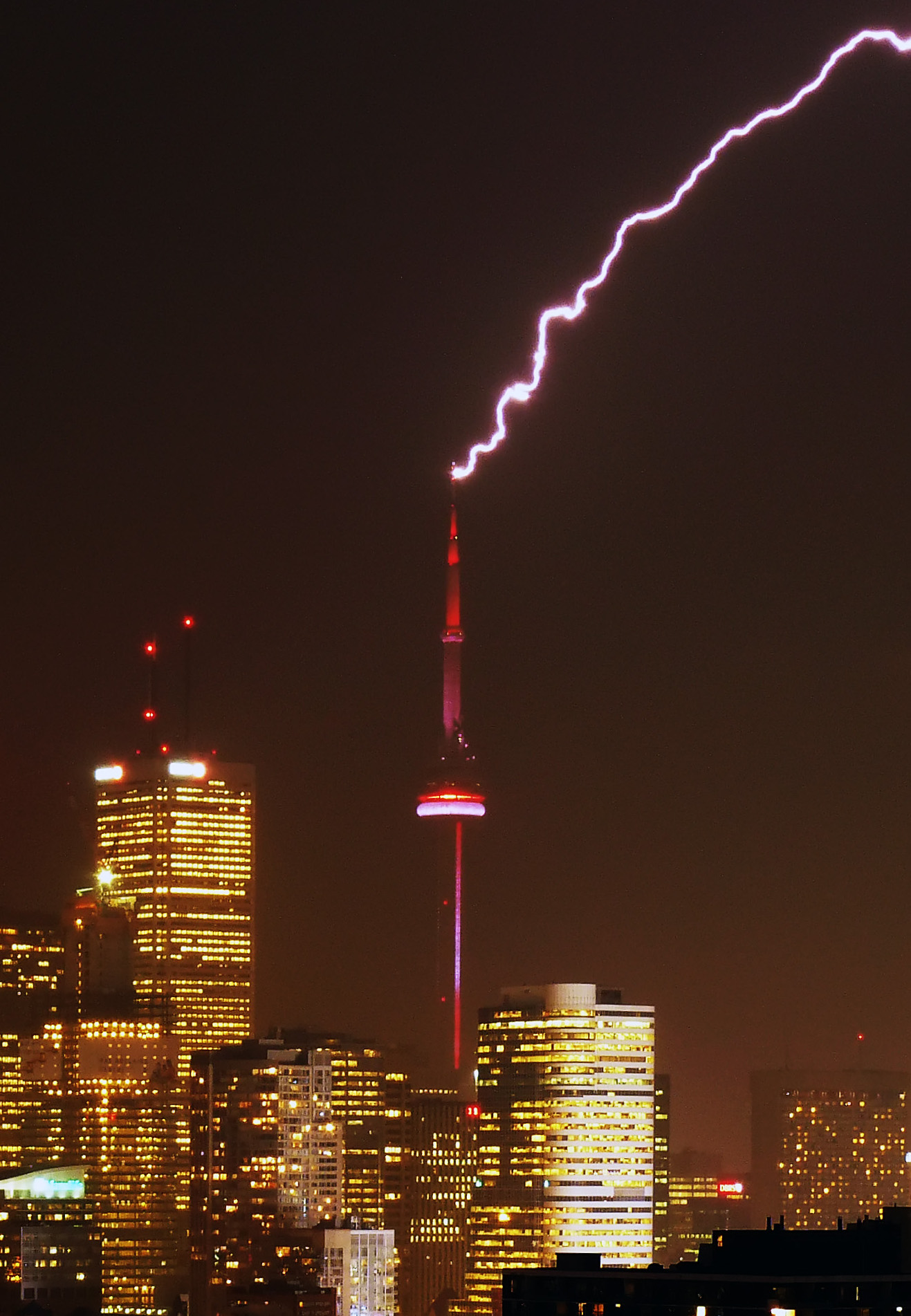
Lightning striking the lightning rod of the CN Tower in Toronto, Canada

A lightning rod or lightning conductor (British English) is a metal rod mounted on a structure and intended to protect it from a lightning strike. If lightning hits the structure, it is most likely to strike the rod and be conducted to ground through a wire, rather than passing through the structure, where it could start a fire or cause electrocution. In technical documents, lightning rods are generally referred to as 'strike termination devices'.

In a lightning protection system, a lightning rod is a single component of the system. The lightning rod requires a connection to the earth to perform its protective function. Lightning rods come in many different forms, including hollow, solid, pointed, rounded, flat strips, or bristle brush-like. All lightning rods must be made of conductive materials, such as copper and aluminum. Copper and its alloys are the most common materials used in lightning protection.

== History ==
The first proper lightning rod was assembled by Father Prokop Diviš, a Czech priest and scientist, who erected a grounded lightning rod in 1754. Diviš's design involved a vertical iron rod topped with a grounded wire, intended to attract lightning strikes and safely conduct them to the ground. His experimental apparatus, known as the weather machine predated Benjamin Franklin's more widely recognized experiments. Franklin then independently developed and popularized his own lightning rod design, which became widely adopted across Europe and North America. Franklin's contribution significantly advanced the understanding and application of lightning protection systems, although Diviš's earlier conceptual work remains an important milestone in the history of electrical safety engineering.

=== British Empire ===
In what later became the United States, the pointed lightning rod conductor (not grounded), also called a lightning attractor or Franklin rod, was conceived by Benjamin Franklin in 1749 as part of his groundbreaking exploration of electricity. Although not the first to suggest a correlation between electricity and lightning, Franklin was the first to propose a workable system for testing his hypothesis. Franklin speculated that, with an iron rod sharpened to a point, "The electrical fire would, I think, be drawn out of a cloud silently, before it could come near enough to strike." Franklin speculated about lightning rods for several years before his reported kite experiment.

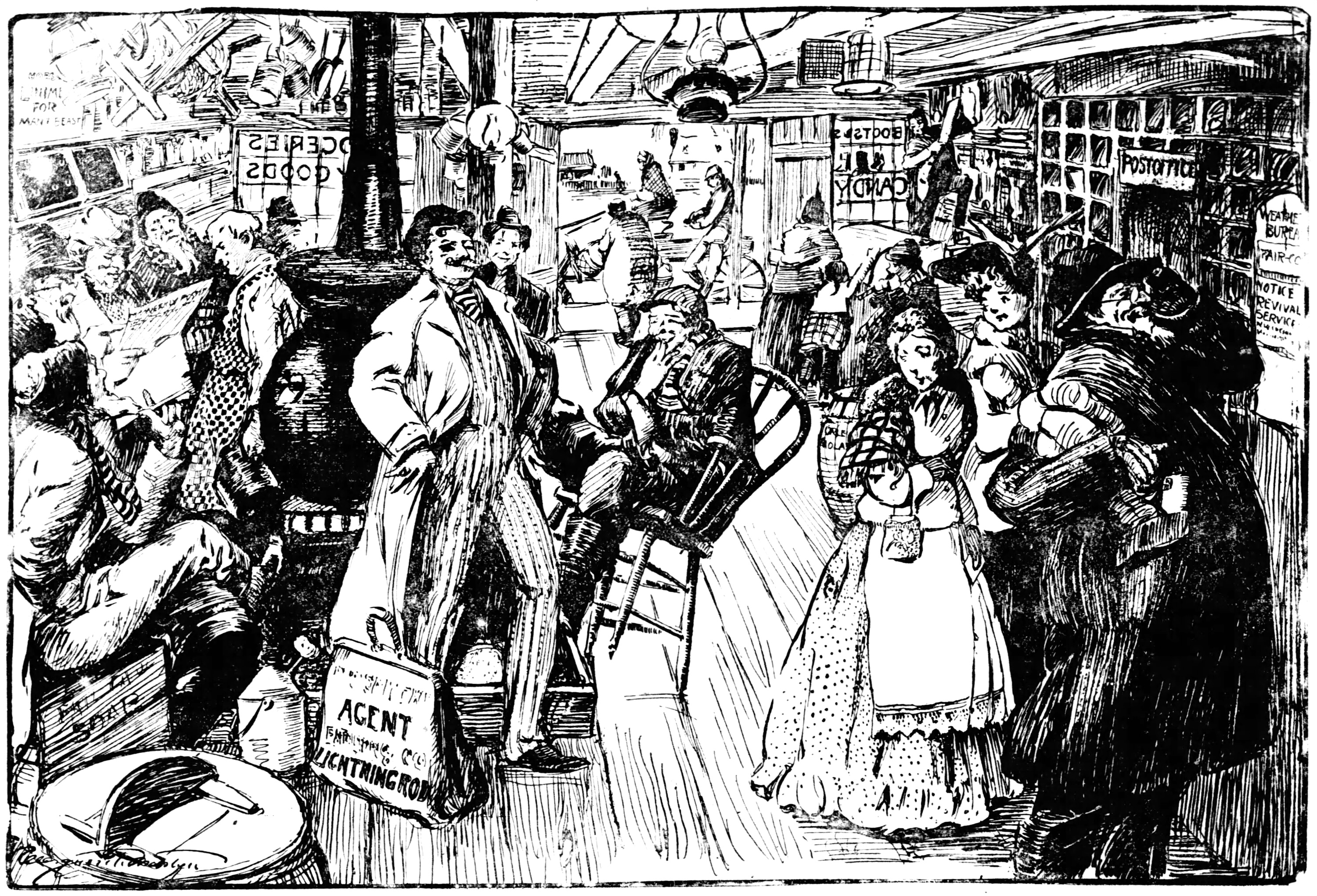
Drawing of a general store by Marguerite Martyn in the St. Louis Post-Dispatch of October 21, 1906, with a traveling salesman selling lightning rods

In the 19th century, the lightning rod became a decorative motif. Lightning rods were embellished with ornamental glass balls (now prized by collectors). The ornamental appeal of these glass balls has been used in weather vanes. The main purpose of these balls, however, is to provide evidence of a lightning strike by shattering or falling off. If after a storm a ball is discovered missing or broken, the property owner should then check the building, rod, and grounding wire for damage.

Balls of solid glass occasionally were used in a method purported to prevent lightning strikes to ships and other objects. The idea was that glass objects, being non-conductors, are seldom struck by lightning. Therefore, goes the theory, there must be something about glass that repels lightning. Hence the best method for preventing a lightning strike to a wooden ship was to bury a small solid glass ball in the tip of the highest mast. The random behavior of lightning combined with observers' confirmation bias ensured the method gained a good bit of credence even after the development of the marine lightning rod soon after Franklin's initial work.

The first lightning conductors on ships were supposed to be hoisted when lightning was anticipated, and had a low success rate. In 1820 William Snow Harris invented a successful system for fitting lightning protection to the wooden sailing ships of the day, but despite successful trials which began in 1830, the British Royal Navy did not adopt the system until 1842, by which time the Imperial Russian Navy had already adopted the system.

In the 1990s, the 'lightning points' were replaced as originally constructed when the Statue of Freedom atop the United States Capitol building in Washington, D.C., was restored. The statue was designed with multiple devices that are tipped with platinum. The Washington Monument was also equipped with multiple lightning points, and the Statue of Liberty in New York Harbor gets hit by lightning, which is shunted to ground.

== Lightning protection system ==
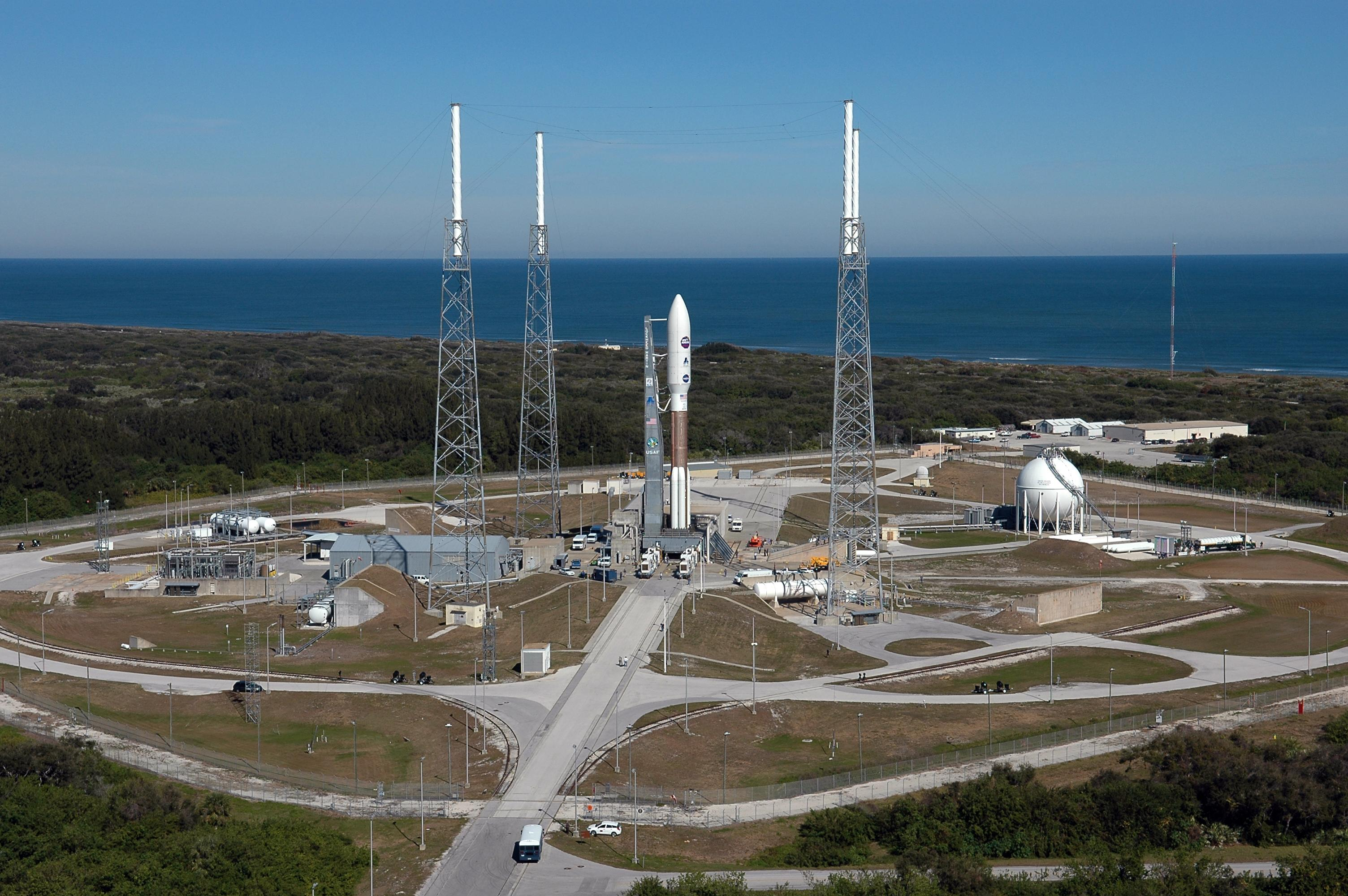
Lightning protection system at a launch pad at Cape Canaveral Space Force Station

A lightning protection system is designed to protect a structure from damage from lightning strikes by intercepting them and safely passing their extremely high currents to ground. A lightning protection system includes a network of air terminals, bonding conductors, and ground electrodes designed to provide a low impedance path to ground for potential strikes.

Lightning protection systems prevent lightning strike damage to structures. Lightning protection systems mitigate the fire hazard that lightning strikes pose to structures. A lightning protection system provides a low-impedance path for the lightning current to lessen the heating effect of current flowing through flammable structural materials. If lightning travels through porous and water-saturated materials, these materials may explode if their water content is flashed to steam by heat produced from the high current. This is why trees are often shattered by lightning strikes.

Because of the high energy and current levels associated with lightning (currents can exceed 150,000 A), and the very rapid rise time of a lightning strike, no protection system can guarantee absolute safety from lightning. Lightning current divides to follow every conductive path to ground, and even divided current can cause damage. Secondary "side-flashes" can be enough to ignite a fire, blow apart brick, stone, or concrete, or injure occupants within a structure or building. However, the benefits of basic lightning protection systems have been evident for well over a century.

Laboratory-scale measurements of the effects of lightning do not scale to applications involving natural lightning. Field applications have mainly been derived from trial and error based on the best intended laboratory research of a highly complex and variable phenomenon.

The parts of a lightning protection system are air terminals (lightning rods or strike termination devices), bonding conductors, ground terminals (ground or "earthing" rods, plates, or mesh), and all of the connectors and supports to complete the system. The air terminals are typically arranged at or along the upper points of a roof structure. They are electrically bonded together by bonding conductors (called "down conductors" or "downleads"), which are connected by the most direct route to one or more grounding or earthing terminals. Connections to the earth electrodes must not only have low resistance, but must have low self-inductance.

An example of a structure vulnerable to lightning is a wooden barn. When lightning strikes the barn, the wooden structure and its contents may be ignited by the heat generated by lightning current conducted through parts of the structure. A basic lightning protection system would provide a conductive path between an air terminal and earth, so that most of the lightning's current will follow the path of the lightning protection system, with substantially less current traveling through flammable materials.

Originally, scientists believed that such a lightning protection system of air terminals and "downleads" directed the current of the lightning down into the earth to be "dissipated". However, high-speed photography has clearly demonstrated that lightning is actually composed of both a cloud component and an oppositely charged ground component. During "cloud-to-ground" lightning, these oppositely charged components usually "meet" somewhere in the atmosphere well above the earth to equalize previously unbalanced charges. The heat generated as this electric current flows through flammable materials is the hazard that lightning protection systems attempt to mitigate by providing a low-resistance path for the lightning circuit. No lightning protection system can be relied upon to "contain" or "control" lightning completely (nor thus far, to prevent lightning strikes entirely), but they do seem to help immensely in most lightning strikes.

Steel-framed structures can bond the structural members to earth to provide lightning protection. A metal flagpole with its foundation in the earth is its own extremely simple lightning protection system. However, the flag(s) flying from the pole during a lightning strike may be completely incinerated.

Most lightning protection systems in use today use the traditional Franklin design. The fundamental principle used in Franklin-type lightning protection systems is to provide a sufficiently low-impedance path for lightning to travel to ground without damaging the building. This is accomplished by surrounding the building in a kind of Faraday cage. A system of lightning protection conductors and lightning rods are installed on the roof of the building to intercept any lightning before it strikes the building.

=== Russia ===
The spire of the Leaning Tower of Nevyansk is crowned with a metallic rod in the shape of a gilded sphere with spikes. It acts as a lightning rod. This lightning rod is grounded through the rebar carcass, which pierces the entire building.

The Nevyansk Tower was built between 1721 and 1745, on the orders of industrialist Akinfiy Demidov. The Nevyansk Tower was built 28 years before Benjamin Franklin's experiment and scientific explanation. However, the true intent behind the metal rooftop and rebars remains unknown.

=== Europe ===
The church tower of many European cities, usually the highest structure in the city, was likely to be struck by lightning. Peter Ahlwardts ("Reasonable and Theological Considerations about Thunder and Lightning", 1745) advised individuals seeking cover from lightning to go anywhere except in or around a church.

There is an ongoing debate over whether a "meteorological machine", invented by Premonstratensian priest Prokop Diviš and erected in Brenditz, (now Přímětice, part of Znojmo), Moravia (now the Czech Republic) in June 1754, does count as an individual invention of the lightning rod. Diviš's apparatus, according to his private theories, aimed to prevent thunderstorms altogether by constantly depriving the air of its superfluous electricity. The apparatus was, however, mounted on a free-standing pole and probably better grounded than Franklin's lightning rods at that time, so it served the purpose of a lightning rod. After local protests, Diviš had to cease his weather experiments around 1760.

== Structure protectors ==
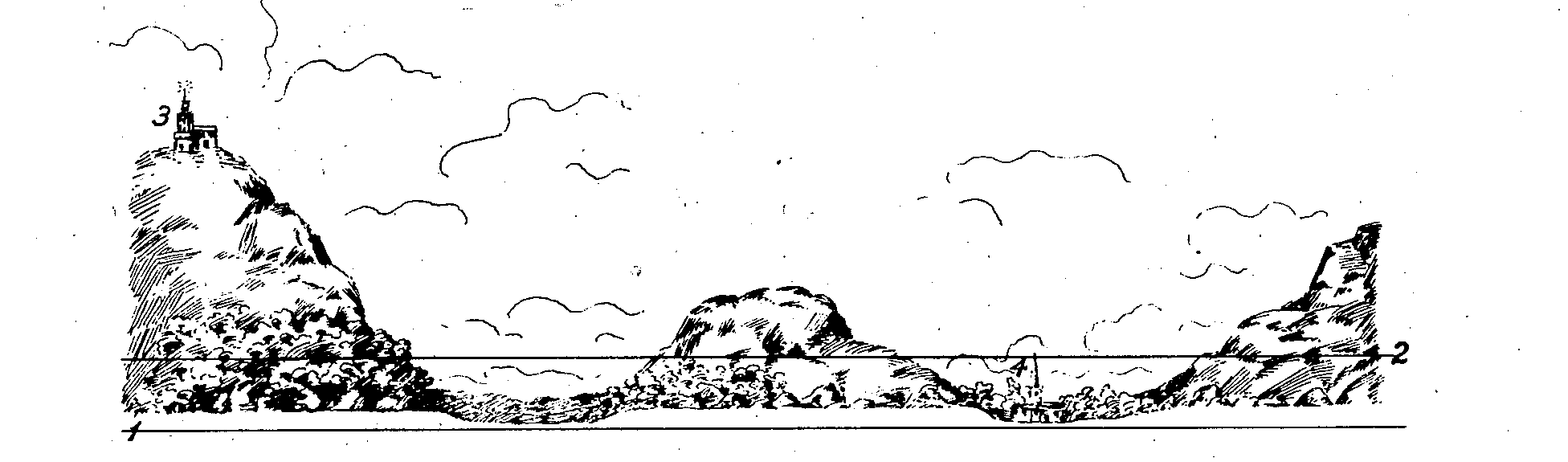
Landscape suited for purpose of explanation: (1) Represents Lord Kelvin's "reduced" area of the region; (2) Surface concentric with the Earth such that the quantities stored over it and under it are equal; (3) Building on a site of excessive electrostatic charge density; (4) Building on a site of low electrostatic charge density. (Image via U.S. patent 1,266,175.)

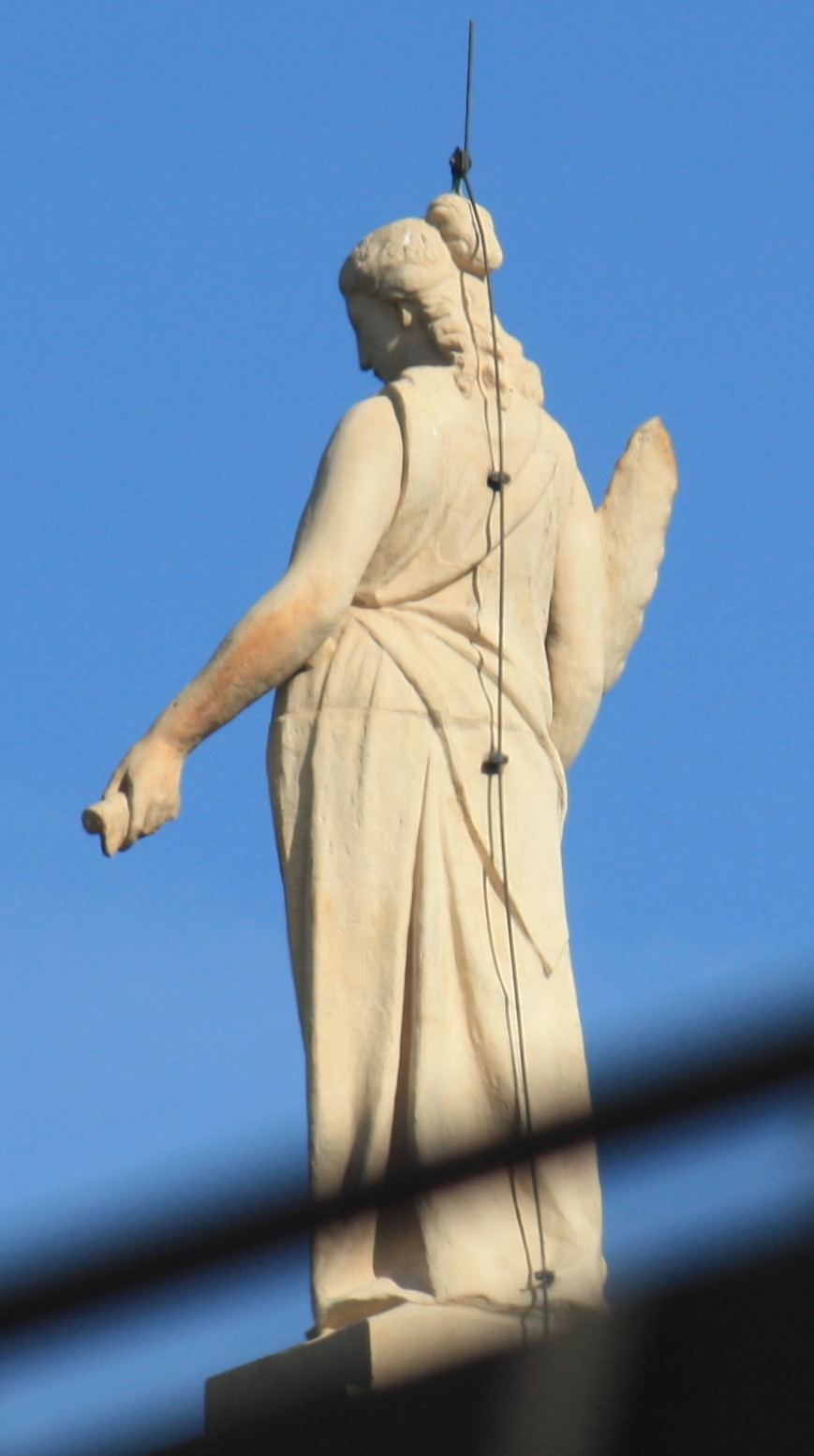
Lightning rod on a statue

=== Lightning arrester ===
A lightning arrester is a device, essentially an air gap between an electric wire and ground, used on electric power systems and telecommunication systems to protect the insulation and conductors of the system from the damaging effects of lightning. The typical lightning arrester has a high-voltage terminal and a ground terminal.

In telegraphy and telephony, a lightning arrester is a device placed where wires enter a structure, in order to prevent damage to electronic instruments within and ensure the safety of individuals near the structures. Smaller versions of lightning arresters, also called surge protectors, are devices that are connected between each electrical conductor in a power or communications system and the ground. They help prevent the flow of the normal power or signal currents to ground, but provide a path over which high-voltage lightning current flows, bypassing the connected equipment. Arresters are used to limit the rise in voltage when a communications or power line is struck by lightning or is near to a lightning strike.

=== Protection of electric distribution systems ===
In overhead electric transmission systems, one or two lighter ground wires may be mounted at the top of pylons, poles, or towers not specifically used to send electricity through the grid. These conductors, often referred to as "static", "pilot" or "shield" wires are designed to be the point of lightning termination instead of the high-voltage lines themselves. These conductors are intended to protect the primary power conductors from lightning strikes.

These conductors are bonded to earth either through the metal structure of a pole or tower, or by additional ground electrodes installed at regular intervals along the line. As a general rule, overhead power lines with voltages below 50 kV do not have a "static" conductor, but most lines carrying more than 50 kV do. The ground conductor cable may also support fibre optic cables for data transmission.

Older lines may use surge arresters which insulate conducting lines from direct bonding with earth and may be used as low voltage communication lines. If the voltage exceeds a certain threshold, such as during a lightning termination to the conductor, it "jumps" the insulators and passes to earth.

Protection of electrical substations is as varied as lightning rods themselves, and is often proprietary to the electric company.

=== Lightning protection of mast radiators ===
Radio mast radiators may be insulated from the ground by a spark gap at the base. When lightning hits the mast, it jumps this gap. A small inductance in the feed line between the mast and the tuning unit (usually one winding) limits the voltage increase, protecting the transmitter from dangerously high voltages. The transmitter must include a device to monitor the antenna's electrical properties. This is important, as charge could remain after a lightning strike, damaging the gap or the insulators.

The monitoring device switches off the transmitter when the antenna shows incorrect behavior, e.g. due to an undesired electrical charge. When the transmitter is switched off, these charges dissipate. The monitoring device makes attempts to switch back on several times. If after several attempts the antenna continues to show improper behavior, possibly as a result of structural damage, the transmitter remains switched off.

=== Lightning conductors and grounding precautions ===
Ideally, the underground part of the assembly should reside in an area of high ground conductivity. If the underground cable is able to resist corrosion well, it can be covered in salt to improve its electrical connection with the ground. While the electrical resistance of the lightning conductor between the air terminal and the Earth is of significant concern, the inductive reactance of the conductor could be more important. For this reason, the down conductor route is kept short, and any curves have a large radius. If these measures are not taken, lightning current may arc over a resistive or reactive obstruction that it encounters in the conductor. At the very least, the arc current will damage the lightning conductor and can easily find another conductive path, such as building wiring or plumbing, and cause fires or other disasters. Grounding systems without low resistivity to the ground can still be effective in protecting a structure from lightning damage. When ground soil has poor conductivity, is very shallow, or non-existent, a grounding system can be augmented by adding ground rods, counterpoise (ground ring) conductor, cable radials projecting away from the building, or a concrete building's reinforcing bars can be used for a ground conductor (Ufer ground). These additions, while still not reducing the resistance of the system in some instances, will allow the [dispersion] of the lightning into the earth without damage to the structure.

Additional precautions must be taken to prevent side-flashes between conductive objects on or in the structure and the lightning protection system. The surge of lightning current through a lightning protection conductor will create a voltage difference between it and any conductive objects that are near it. This voltage difference can be large enough to cause a dangerous side-flash (spark) between the two that can cause significant damage, especially on structures housing flammable or explosive materials. The most effective way to prevent this potential damage is to ensure the electrical continuity between the lightning protection system and any objects susceptible to a side-flash. Effective bonding will allow the voltage potential of the two objects to rise and fall simultaneously, thereby eliminating any risk of a side-flash.

=== Lightning protection system design ===
Considerable material is used to make up lightning protection systems, so it is prudent to consider carefully where an air terminal will provide the greatest protection. Historical understanding of lightning, from statements made by Ben Franklin, assumed that each lightning rod protected a cone of 45 degrees. This has been found to be unsatisfactory for protecting taller structures, as it is possible for lightning to strike the side of a building.

A modeling system based on a better understanding of the termination targeting of lightning, called the Rolling Sphere Method, was developed by Dr Tibor Horváth. It has become the standard by which traditional Franklin Rod systems are installed. To understand this requires knowledge of how lightning 'moves'. As the step leader of a lightning bolt jumps toward the ground, it steps toward the grounded objects nearest its path. The maximum distance that each step may travel is called the critical distance and is proportional to the electric current. Objects are likely to be struck if they are nearer to the leader than this critical distance. It is standard practice to approximate the sphere's radius as 46 m near the ground.

An object outside the critical distance is unlikely to be struck by the leader if there is a solidly grounded object within the critical distance. Locations that are considered safe from lightning can be determined by imagining a leader's potential paths as a sphere that travels from the cloud to the ground. For lightning protection, it suffices to consider all possible spheres as they touch potential strike points. To determine strike points, consider a sphere rolling over the terrain. At each point, a potential leader position is simulated. Lightning is most likely to strike where the sphere touches the ground. Points that the sphere cannot roll across and touch are safest from lightning. Lightning protectors should be placed where they will prevent the sphere from touching a structure. A weak point in most lightning diversion systems is in transporting the captured discharge from the lightning rod to the ground, though. Lightning rods are typically installed around the perimeter of flat roofs, or along the peaks of sloped roofs at intervals of 6.1 m or 7.6 m, depending on the height of the rod. When a flat roof has dimensions greater than 15 m by 15 m, additional air terminals will be installed in the middle of the roof at intervals of 15 m or less in a rectangular grid pattern.

=== Rounded versus pointed ends ===
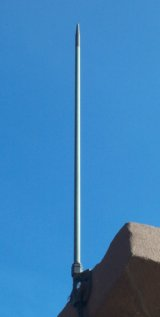
Pointed lightning rod on a building

The optimal shape for the tip of a lightning rod has been controversial since the 18th century. During the period of political confrontation between Britain and its American colonies, British scientists maintained that a lightning rod should have a ball on its end, while American scientists maintained that there should be a point. As of 2003, the controversy had not been completely resolved. It is difficult to resolve the controversy because proper controlled experiments are nearly impossible, but work performed by Charles B. Moore, et al., in 2000 has shed some light on the issue, finding that moderately rounded or blunt-tipped lightning rods act as marginally better strike receptors. As a result, round-tipped rods are installed on most new systems in the United States, though most existing systems still have pointed rods. According to the study,

[c]alculations of the relative strengths of the electric fields above similarly exposed sharp and blunt rods show that while the fields are much stronger at the tip of a sharp rod prior to any emissions, they decrease more rapidly with distance. As a result, at a few centimeters above the tip of a 20-mm-diameter blunt rod, the strength of the field is greater than over an otherwise similar, sharper rod of the same height. Since the field strength at the tip of a sharpened rod tends to be limited by the easy formation of ions in the surrounding air, the field strengths over blunt rods can be much stronger than those at distances greater than 1 cm over sharper ones.
The results of this study suggest that moderately blunt metal rods (with tip height to tip radius of curvature ratios of about 680:1) are better lightning strike receptors than sharper rods or very blunt ones.

Additionally, the height of the lightning protector relative to the structure, and indeed the Earth itself, both have an effect.

=== Charge transfer theory ===
The charge transfer theory states that a lightning strike to a protected structure can be prevented by reducing the electrical potential between the protected structure and the thundercloud. This is done by transferring electric charge (such as from the nearby Earth to the sky or vice versa). Transferring electric charge from the Earth to the sky is done by installing engineered products composed of many points above the structure. It is noted that pointed objects will indeed transfer charge to the surrounding atmosphere and that a considerable electric current can be measured through the conductors as ionization occurs at the point when an electric field is present, such as happens when thunderclouds are overhead.

In the United States, the National Fire Protection Association (NFPA) does not currently endorse a device that can prevent or reduce lightning strikes. The NFPA Standards Council, following a request for a project to address Dissipation Array[tm] Systems and Charge Transfer Systems, denied the request to begin forming standards on such technology (though the Council did not foreclose on future standards development after reliable sources demonstrating the validity of the basic technology and science were submitted).

=== Early streamer emission (ESE) theory ===
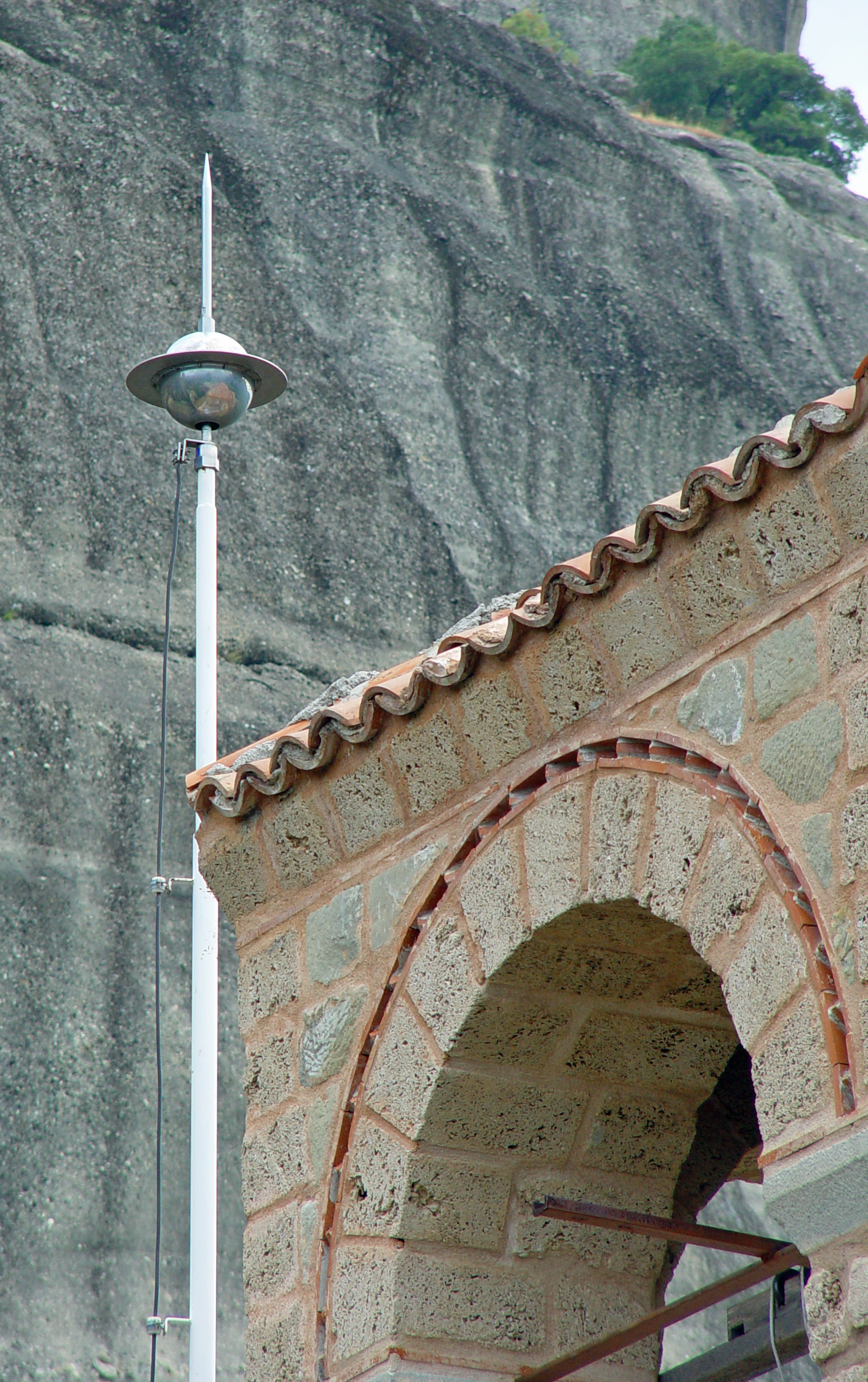
ESE lightning rod mounted at the Monastery of St. Nicholas Anapausas (Μονή του Αγίου Νικολάου), Meteora, Greece

The theory of early streamer emission proposes that if a lightning rod has a mechanism producing ionization near its tip, then its lightning capture area is greatly increased. At first, small quantities of radioactive isotopes (radium-226 or americium-241) were used as sources of ionization between 1930 and 1980, later replaced with various electrical and electronic devices. According to an early patent, since most lightning protectors' ground potentials are elevated, the path distance from the source to the elevated ground point will be shorter, creating a stronger field (measured in volts per unit distance) and that structure will be more prone to ionization and breakdown.

AFNOR, the French national standardization body, issued a standard, NF C 17-102:2011, covering this technology. The NFPA also investigated the subject and there was a proposal to issue a similar standard in the USA. Initially, an NFPA independent third party panel stated that "the [Early Streamer Emission] lightning protection technology appears to be technically sound" and that there was an "adequate theoretical basis for the [Early Streamer Emission] air terminal concept and design from a physical viewpoint".) The same panel also concluded that "the recommended [NFPA 781 standard] lightning protection system has never been scientifically or technically validated and the Franklin rod air terminals have not been validated in field tests under thunderstorm conditions".

In response, the American Geophysical Union concluded that "[t]he Bryan Panel reviewed essentially none of the studies and literature on the effectiveness and scientific basis of traditional lightning protection systems and was erroneous in its conclusion that there was no basis for the Standard". AGU did not attempt to assess the effectiveness of any proposed modifications to traditional systems in its report. The NFPA withdrew its proposed draft edition of standard 781 due to a lack of evidence of increased effectiveness of Early Streamer Emission-based protection systems over conventional air terminals.

Members of the Scientific Committee of the International Conference on Lightning Protection (ICLP) have issued a joint statement stating their opposition to Early Streamer Emission technology. ICLP maintained a web page with information related to ESE and related technologies until 2016.

== Analysis of strikes ==
Lightning strikes to a metallic structure can vary from leaving no evidence—except, perhaps, a small pit in the metal—to the complete destruction of the structure. When there is no evidence, analyzing the strikes is difficult. This means that a strike on an uninstrumented structure must be visually confirmed, and the random behavior of lightning renders such observations difficult. Inventors have patented lightning rockets. Whilst controlled experiments might eventually become feasible, very good contemporaneous data is obtained via specialized radio receivers which record the characteristic electrical "signature" of lightning strikes. Through extremely accurate timing and triangulation techniques, lightning strikes can be located with great precision such that strikes on specific objects can often be pinpointed with a high degree of confidence.

The energy in a lightning strike is typically in the range of 1 to 10 billion joules. This energy is usually released in a small number of separate strokes, each with duration of a few tens of microseconds (typically 30 to 50 microseconds), over a period of approximately a fifth of a second. The vast majority of the energy is dissipated as heat, light and sound in the atmosphere, with a minority via conduction to ground (in both aspects of "ground").

== Aircraft protectors ==
Aircraft are protected by devices mounted to the aircraft structure and by the design of internal systems. Lightning usually enters and exits an aircraft through the outer surface of its airframe or through static wicks. The lightning protection system provides safe conductive paths between the entry and exit points to prevent damage to electronic equipment and to protect flammable fuel or cargo from sparks.

These paths are constructed of conductive materials. Electrical insulators are only effective in combination with a conductive path because blocked lightning can easily exceed the breakdown voltage of insulators. Composite materials are constructed with layers of wire mesh to make them sufficiently conductive and structural joints are protected by making an electrical connection across the joint.

Shielded cable and conductive enclosures provide most protection for electronic systems. The lightning current emits a magnetic pulse which induces current through any loops formed by the cables. The current induced in the shield of a loop creates magnetic flux through the loop in the opposite direction. This decreases the total flux through the loop and the induced voltage around it.

The lightning-conductive path and conductive shielding carry most of the current. The remainder is bypassed around sensitive electronics using transient voltage suppressors, and blocked using electronic filters once the let-through voltage is low enough. Filters, like insulators, are only effective when lightning and surge currents can flow through an alternate path.

== Watercraft protectors ==
A lightning protection installation on a watercraft comprises a lightning protector mounted on the top of a mast or superstructure, and a grounding conductor in contact with the water. Electrical conductors attach to the protector and run down to the conductor. For a vessel with a conducting (iron or steel) hull, the grounding conductor is the hull. For a vessel with a non-conducting hull, the grounding conductor may be retractable, attached to the hull, or attached to a centerboard.

== Risk assessment ==
Some structures are inherently more or less at risk of being struck by lightning. The risk for a structure is a function of the size (area) of a structure, the height, and the number of lightning strikes per year per mi^{2} for the region. For example, a small building will be less likely to be struck than a large one, and a building in an area with a high density of lightning strikes will be more likely to be struck than one in an area with a low density of lightning strikes. The National Fire Protection Association provides a risk assessment worksheet in their lightning protection standard.

The International Electrotechnical Commission (IEC) lightning risk assessment comprises four parts: loss of living beings, loss of service to the public, loss of cultural heritage, and loss of economic value. Loss of living beings is rated as the most important and is the only loss taken into consideration for many nonessential industrial and commercial applications.

== Standards ==
The introduction of lightning protection systems into standards allowed manufacturers to develop protector systems to a multitude of specifications. Multiple international, national, corporate and military lightning protection standards exist.

- NFPA-780: "Standard for the Installation of Lightning Protection Systems" (2014)
- M440.1-1, Electrical Storms and Lightning Protection, Department of Energy
- AFI 32-1065 – Grounding Systems, U. S. Air Force Space Command
- FAA STD 019e, Lightning and Surge Protection, Grounding, Bonding and Shielding Requirements for Facilities and Electronic Equipment
- UL standards for lightning protection
  - UL 96: "Standard of Lightning Protection Components" (5th Edition, 2005)
  - UL 96A: "Standard for Installation Requirements for Lightning Protection Systems" (Twelfth Edition, 2007)
  - UL 1449: "Standard for Surge Protective Devices" (Fourth Edition, 2014)
- IEC standards
  - EN 61000-4-5/IEC 61000-4-5: "Electromagnetic compatibility (EMC) – Part 4-5: Testing and measurement techniques – Surge immunity test"
  - EN 62305/IEC 62305:2024: "Protection against lightning"
  - EN 62561/IEC 62561: "Lightning Protection System Components (LPSC)"
- ITU-T K Series recommendations: "Protection against interference"
- IEEE standards for grounding
  - IEEE SA-142-2007: "IEEE Recommended Practice for Grounding of Industrial and Commercial Power Systems". (2007)
  - IEEE SA-1100-2005: "IEEE Recommended Practice for Powering and Grounding Electronic Equipment" (2005)
- AFNOR NF C 17-102: "Lightning protection – Protection of structures and open areas against lightning using early streamer emission air terminals" (1995)
- GB 50057-2010 Design Code for Lightning Protection of Buildings
- AS / NZS 1768:2007: "Lightning protection"

== See also ==
- Apollo 12 – A Saturn V rocket that was struck by lightning shortly after liftoff.
- James Otis Jr. – Contemporary of Benjamin Franklin, killed at doorway by lightning in Andover, Massachusetts, on May 23, 1783.
- Ground (electricity)
- Grounding kit
- Lightning
- Lightning rod fashion
- The Autobiography of Benjamin Franklin
- Václav Prokop Diviš (1698–1765) – Constructor of the first grounded lightning rod, in Přímětice u Znojma during 1750–1754.
