= Grounding kit =

A grounding kit (or earthing kit) can be described as a kind of lightning protector which avoids lightning punctures on cables. It is used for grounding /earthing coaxial cables of copper or aluminium on antenna installations for telecommunication (mobile communications).

== Construction ==
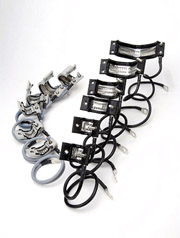
Grounding kits for different diameters

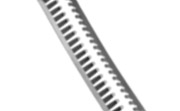
Part of a tin-plated ripple

Grounding kits / Earthing kits are composed of two main components, a clamp and a cable. The clamp will be screwed on a coaxial cable and in case of lightning strokes in the antenna installation, the voltage will be diverted over a ripple in the clamp with the combined cable and will be earthed / grounded by this way.

The clamps of the grounding kits / earthing kits are composed of an ozone- and UV-resistant rubber coat with a device where the ripple can be lodged. The tin-plated ripple with a special alloying enables the bridging over big tolerances between kit and coaxial cable which is important for a best possible voltage transmission. The ripple to the skinned coaxial cable has a low contact resistance between 0.10 and 0.15 mΩ. It also enables a better length compensation as well as even and low contact pressures, which avoids damages on the coaxial cable. These characteristics are known as relaxation behaviour.

== Assembly ==
For assembling a grounding kit / earthing kit with integrated cable lug the coaxial cable is skinned, the grounding kit / earthing kit is set and tightened by a screw.
