= List of MOSFET applications =

MOSFET, showing gate (G), body (B), source (S), and drain (D) terminals. The gate is separated from the body by an insulating layer (pink).

The MOSFET (metal–oxide–semiconductor field-effect transistor) is a type of insulated-gate field-effect transistor (IGFET) that is fabricated by the controlled oxidation of a semiconductor, typically silicon. The voltage of the covered gate determines the electrical conductivity of the device; this ability to change conductivity with the amount of applied voltage can be used for amplifying or switching electronic signals.

The MOSFET is the basic building block of most modern electronics, and the most frequently manufactured device in history, with an estimated total of 13 sextillion (1.3 × 10^{22}) MOSFETs manufactured between 1960 and 2018. It is the most common semiconductor device in digital and analog circuits, and the most common power device. It was the first truly compact transistor that could be miniaturized and mass-produced for a wide range of uses. MOSFET scaling and miniaturization has been driving the rapid exponential growth of electronic semiconductor technology since the 1960s, and enable high-density integrated circuits (ICs) such as memory chips and microprocessors.

MOSFETs in integrated circuits are the primary elements of computer processors, semiconductor memory, image sensors, and most other types of integrated circuits. Discrete MOSFET devices are widely used in applications such as switch-mode power supplies, variable-frequency drives, and other power electronics applications where each device may be switching thousands of watts. Radio-frequency amplifiers up to the UHF spectrum use MOSFET transistors as analog signal and power amplifiers. Radio systems also use MOSFETs as oscillators, or mixers to convert frequencies. MOSFET devices are also applied in audio-frequency power amplifiers for public address systems, sound reinforcement, and home and automobile sound systems.

== Integrated circuits ==
The MOSFET, invented by a Bell Labs team under Mohamed Atalla and Dawon Kahng between 1959 and 1960, is the most widely used type of transistor and the most critical device component in integrated circuit (IC) chips. Planar process, developed by Jean Hoerni at Fairchild Semiconductor in early 1959, was also critical to the invention of the monolithic integrated circuit chip by Robert Noyce later in 1959. This was followed by the development of clean rooms to reduce contamination to levels never before thought necessary, and coincided with the development of photolithography which, along with surface passivation and the planar process, allowed circuits to be made in few steps.

Atalla realised that the main advantage of a MOS transistor was its ease of fabrication, particularly suiting it for use in the recently invented integrated circuits. In contrast to bipolar transistors which required a number of steps for the p–n junction isolation of transistors on a chip, MOSFETs required no such steps but could be easily isolated from each other. Its advantage for integrated circuits was re-iterated by Dawon Kahng in 1961. The Si–SiO_{2} system possessed the technical attractions of low cost of production (on a per circuit basis) and ease of integration. These two factors, along with its rapidly scaling miniaturization and low energy consumption, led to the MOSFET becoming the most widely used type of transistor in IC chips.

The earliest experimental MOS IC to be demonstrated was a 16-transistor chip built by Fred Heiman and Steven Hofstein at RCA in 1962. General Microelectronics later introduced the first commercial MOS integrated circuits in 1964, consisting of 120 p-channel transistors. It was a 20-bit shift register, developed by Robert Norman and Frank Wanlass. In 1967, Bell Labs researchers Robert Kerwin, Donald Klein and John Sarace developed the self-aligned gate (silicon-gate) MOS transistor, which Fairchild Semiconductor researchers Federico Faggin and Tom Klein used to develop the first silicon-gate MOS IC.

=== Chips ===
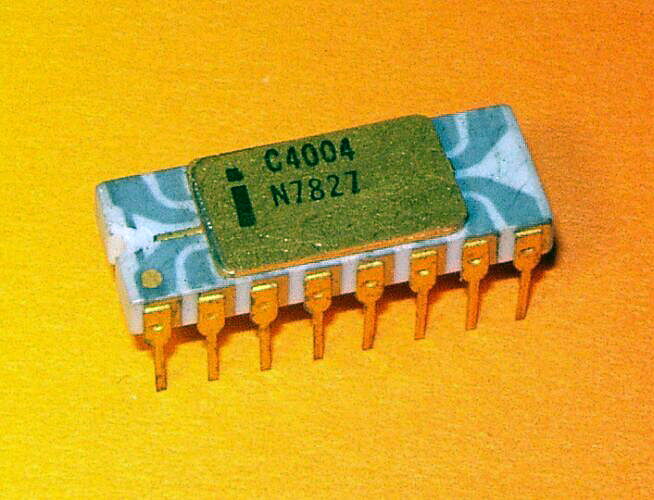
Intel 4004 (1971), the first single-chip microprocessor. It is a 4-bit central processing unit (CPU), fabricated on a silicon-gate PMOS large-scale integration (LSI) chip with a 10 μm process.

There are various different types of MOS IC chips, which include the following.

- Digital integrated circuit
- Analog integrated circuit
- Application-specific integrated circuit (ASIC)
- Arithmetic logic unit (ALU)
- MOS large-scale integration (MOS LSI) – very large scale integration (VLSI), microcontroller, application-specific standard product (ASSP), chipset, co-processor, system-on-a-chip, graphics processing unit (GPU)
- IC packaging
- Microprocessors – central processing unit (CPU), Microarchitectures (such as x86, ARM architecture, MIPS architecture, SPARC), multi-core processor
- Mixed-signal integrated circuit
- Programmable logic device (PLD) – CPLD, EPLD, FPGA
- Three-dimensional integrated circuit (3D IC) – through-silicon via (TSV)

=== Large-scale integration ===
With its high scalability, and much lower power consumption and higher density than bipolar junction transistors, the MOSFET made it possible to build high-density IC chips. By 1964, MOS chips had reached higher transistor density and lower manufacturing costs than bipolar chips. MOS chips further increased in complexity at a rate predicted by Moore's law, leading to large-scale integration (LSI) with hundreds of MOSFETs on a chip by the late 1960s. MOS technology enabled the integration of more than 10,000 transistors on a single LSI chip by the early 1970s, before later enabling very large-scale integration (VLSI).

=== Microprocessors ===
The MOSFET is the basis of every microprocessor, and was responsible for the invention of the microprocessor. The origins of both the microprocessor and the microcontroller can be traced back to the invention and development of MOS technology. The application of MOS LSI chips to computing was the basis for the first microprocessors, as engineers began recognizing that a complete computer processor could be contained on a single MOS LSI chip.

The earliest microprocessors were all MOS chips, built with MOS LSI circuits. The first multi-chip microprocessors, the Four-Phase Systems AL1 in 1969 and the Garrett AiResearch MP944 in 1970, were developed with multiple MOS LSI chips. The first commercial single-chip microprocessor, the Intel 4004, was developed by Federico Faggin, using his silicon-gate MOS IC technology, with Intel engineers Marcian Hoff and Stan Mazor, and Busicom engineer Masatoshi Shima. With the arrival of CMOS microprocessors in 1975, the term "MOS microprocessors" began to refer to chips fabricated entirely from PMOS logic or fabricated entirely from NMOS logic, contrasted with "CMOS microprocessors" and "bipolar bit-slice processors".

== CMOS circuits ==
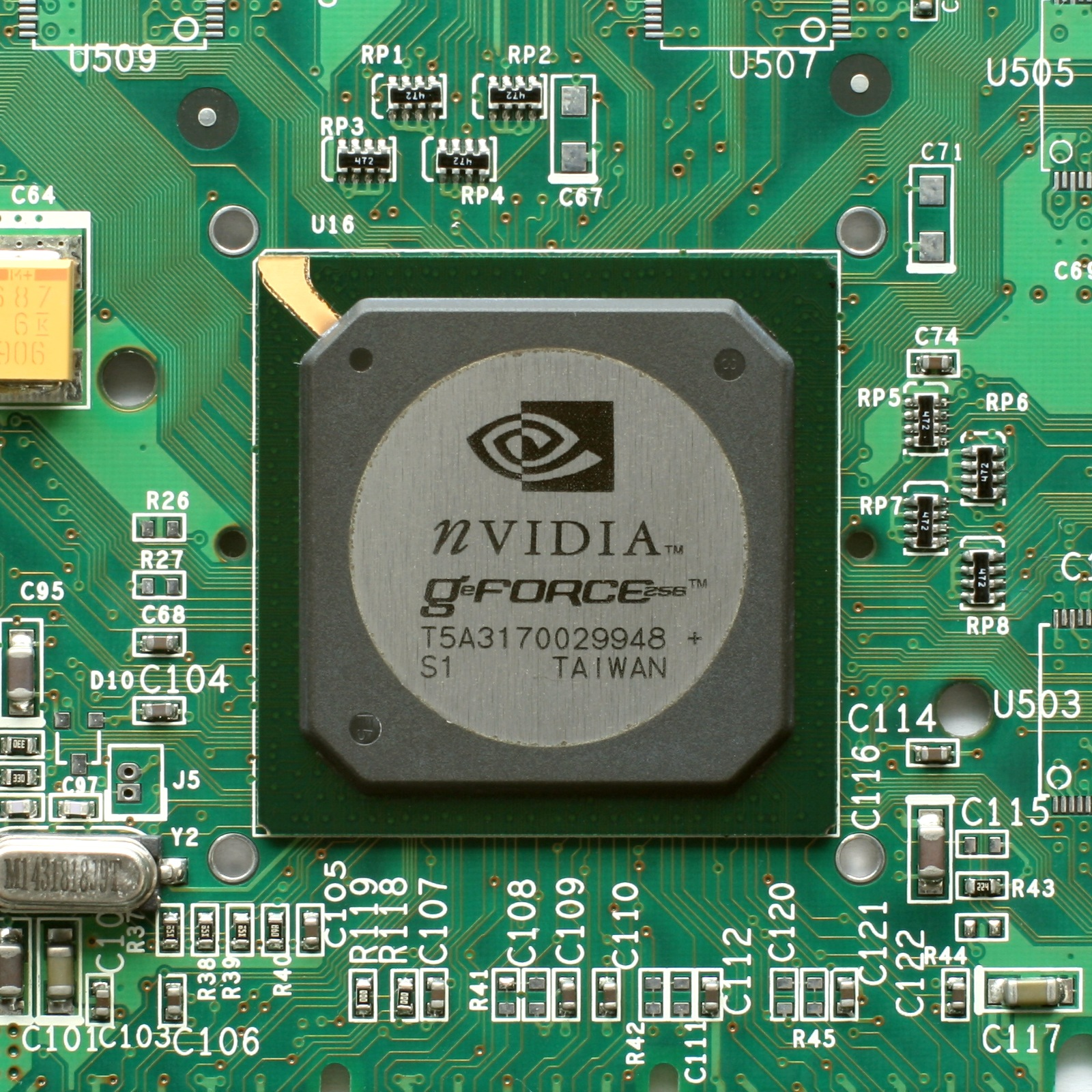
Nvidia GeForce 256 (1999), an early graphics processing unit (GPU), fabricated on TSMC's 220 nm CMOS integrated circuit (IC) chip

Complementary metal–oxide–semiconductor (CMOS) logic was developed by Chih-Tang Sah and Frank Wanlass at Fairchild Semiconductor in 1963. CMOS had lower power consumption, but was initially slower than NMOS, which was more widely used for computers in the 1970s. In 1978, Hitachi introduced the twin-well CMOS process, which allowed CMOS to match the performance of NMOS with less power consumption. The twin-well CMOS process eventually overtook NMOS as the most common semiconductor manufacturing process for computers in the 1980s. By the 1980s CMOS logic consumed over 7 times less power than NMOS logic, and about 100,000 times less power than bipolar transistor-transistor logic (TTL).

=== Digital ===
The growth of digital technologies like the microprocessor has provided the motivation to advance MOSFET technology faster than any other type of silicon-based transistor. A big advantage of MOSFETs for digital switching is that the oxide layer between the gate and the channel prevents DC current from flowing through the gate, further reducing power consumption and giving a very large input impedance. The insulating oxide between the gate and channel effectively isolates a MOSFET in one logic stage from earlier and later stages, which allows a single MOSFET output to drive a considerable number of MOSFET inputs. Bipolar transistor-based logic (such as TTL) does not have such a high fanout capacity. This isolation also makes it easier for the designers to ignore to some extent loading effects between logic stages independently. That extent is defined by the operating frequency: as frequencies increase, the input impedance of the MOSFETs decreases.

=== Analog ===
The MOSFET's advantages in digital circuits do not translate into supremacy in all analog circuits. The two types of circuit draw upon different features of transistor behavior. Digital circuits switch, spending most of their time either fully on or fully off. The transition from one to the other is only of concern with regards to speed and charge required. Analog circuits depend on operation in the transition region where small changes to V_{gs} can modulate the output (drain) current. The JFET and bipolar junction transistor (BJT) are preferred for accurate matching (of adjacent devices in integrated circuits), higher transconductance and certain temperature characteristics which simplify keeping performance predictable as circuit temperature varies.

Nevertheless, MOSFETs are widely used in many types of analog circuits because of their own advantages (zero gate current, high and adjustable output impedance and improved robustness vs. BJTs which can be permanently degraded by even lightly breaking down the emitter-base). The characteristics and performance of many analog circuits can be scaled up or down by changing the sizes (length and width) of the MOSFETs used. By comparison, in bipolar transistors the size of the device does not significantly affect its performance. MOSFETs' ideal characteristics regarding gate current (zero) and drain-source offset voltage (zero) also make them nearly ideal switch elements, and also make switched capacitor analog circuits practical. In their linear region, MOSFETs can be used as precision resistors, which can have a much higher controlled resistance than BJTs. In high power circuits, MOSFETs sometimes have the advantage of not suffering from thermal runaway as BJTs do. Also, MOSFETs can be configured to perform as capacitors and gyrator circuits which allow op-amps made from them to appear as inductors, thereby allowing all of the normal analog devices on a chip (except for diodes, which can be made smaller than a MOSFET anyway) to be built entirely out of MOSFETs. This means that complete analog circuits can be made on a silicon chip in a much smaller space and with simpler fabrication techniques. MOSFETS are ideally suited to switch inductive loads because of tolerance to inductive kickback.

Some ICs combine analog and digital MOSFET circuitry on a single mixed-signal integrated circuit, making the needed board space even smaller. This creates a need to isolate the analog circuits from the digital circuits on a chip level, leading to the use of isolation rings and silicon on insulator (SOI). Since MOSFETs require more space to handle a given amount of power than a BJT, fabrication processes can incorporate BJTs and MOSFETs into a single device. Mixed-transistor devices are called bi-FETs (bipolar FETs) if they contain just one BJT-FET and BiCMOS (bipolar-CMOS) if they contain complementary BJT-FETs. Such devices have the advantages of both insulated gates and higher current density.

=== RF CMOS ===
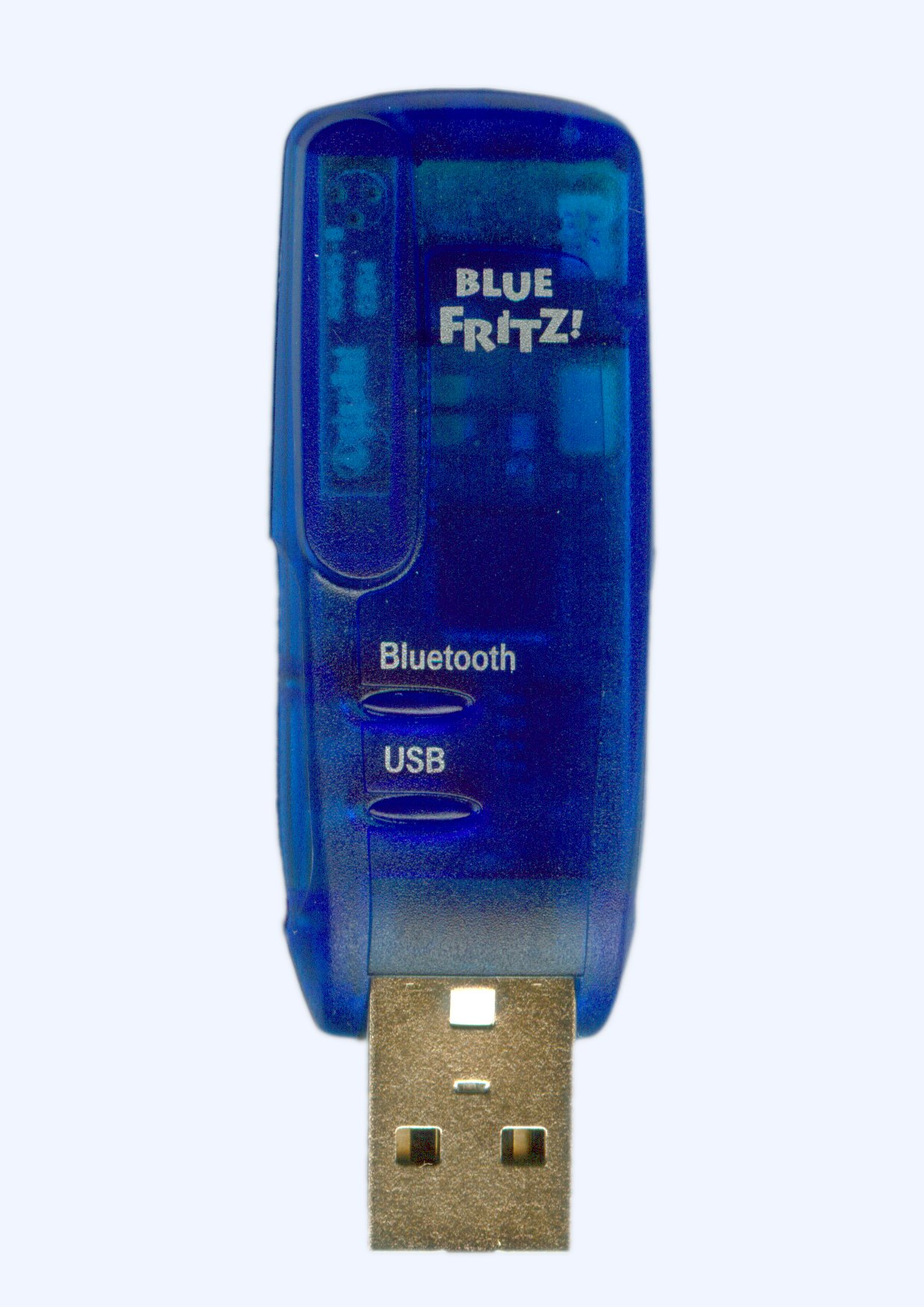
Bluetooth dongle. RF CMOS mixed-signal integrated circuits are widely used in nearly all modern Bluetooth devices.

In the late 1980s, Asad Abidi pioneered RF CMOS technology, which uses MOS VLSI circuits, while working at UCLA. This changed the way in which RF circuits were designed, away from discrete bipolar transistors and towards CMOS integrated circuits. As of 2008, the radio transceivers in all wireless networking devices and modern mobile phones are mass-produced as RF CMOS devices. RF CMOS is also used in nearly all modern Bluetooth and wireless LAN (WLAN) devices.

== Analog switches ==
MOSFET analog switches use the MOSFET to pass analog signals when on, and as a high impedance when off. Signals flow in both directions across a MOSFET switch. In this application, the drain and source of a MOSFET exchange places depending on the relative voltages of the source/drain electrodes. The source is the more negative side for an N-MOS or the more positive side for a P-MOS. All of these switches are limited on what signals they can pass or stop by their gate–source, gate–drain, and source–drain voltages; exceeding the voltage, current, or power limits will potentially damage the switch.

=== Single-type ===
This analog switch uses a four-terminal simple MOSFET of either P or N type.

In the case of an n-type switch, the body is connected to the most negative supply (usually GND) and the gate is used as the switch control. Whenever the gate voltage exceeds the source voltage by at least a threshold voltage, the MOSFET conducts. The higher the voltage, the more the MOSFET can conduct. An N-MOS switch passes all voltages less than V_{gate} − V_{tn}. When the switch is conducting, it typically operates in the linear (or ohmic) mode of operation, since the source and drain voltages will typically be nearly equal.

In the case of a P-MOS, the body is connected to the most positive voltage, and the gate is brought to a lower potential to turn the switch on. The P-MOS switch passes all voltages higher than V_{gate} − V_{tp} (threshold voltage V_{tp} is negative in the case of enhancement-mode P-MOS).

=== Dual-type (CMOS) ===
This "complementary" or CMOS type of switch uses one P-MOS and one N-MOS FET to counteract the limitations of the single-type switch. The FETs have their drains and sources connected in parallel, the body of the P-MOS is connected to the high potential (V_{DD}) and the body of the N-MOS is connected to the low potential (gnd). To turn the switch on, the gate of the P-MOS is driven to the low potential and the gate of the N-MOS is driven to the high potential. For voltages between V_{DD} − V_{tn} and gnd − V_{tp}, both FETs conduct the signal; for voltages less than gnd − V_{tp}, the N-MOS conducts alone; and for voltages greater than V_{DD} − V_{tn}, the P-MOS conducts alone.

The voltage limits for this switch are the gate–source, gate–drain and source–drain voltage limits for both FETs. Also, the P-MOS is typically two to three times wider than the N-MOS, so the switch will be balanced for speed in the two directions.

Tri-state circuitry sometimes incorporates a CMOS MOSFET switch on its output to provide for a low-ohmic, full-range output when on, and a high-ohmic, mid-level signal when off.

== MOS memory ==
DDR4 SDRAM dual in-line memory module (DIMM). It is a type of DRAM (dynamic random-access memory), which uses MOS memory cells consisting of MOSFETs and MOS capacitors.

The advent of the MOSFET enabled the practical use of MOS transistors as memory cell storage elements, a function previously served by magnetic cores in computer memory. The first modern computer memory was introduced in 1965, when John Schmidt at Fairchild Semiconductor designed the first MOS semiconductor memory, a 64-bit MOS SRAM (static random-access memory). SRAM became an alternative to magnetic-core memory, but required six MOS transistors for each bit of data.

MOS technology is the basis for DRAM (dynamic random-access memory). In 1966, Dr. Robert H. Dennard at the IBM Thomas J. Watson Research Center was working on MOS memory. While examining the characteristics of MOS technology, he found it was capable of building capacitors, and that storing a charge or no charge on the MOS capacitor could represent the 1 and 0 of a bit, while the MOS transistor could control writing the charge to the capacitor. This led to his development of a single-transistor DRAM memory cell. In 1967, Dennard filed a patent under IBM for a single-transistor DRAM (dynamic random-access memory) memory cell, based on MOS technology. MOS memory enabled higher performance, was cheaper, and consumed less power, than magnetic-core memory, leading to MOS memory overtaking magnetic core memory as the dominant computer memory technology by the early 1970s.

Frank Wanlass, while studying MOSFET structures in 1963, noted the movement of charge through oxide onto a gate. While he did not pursue it, this idea would later become the basis for EPROM (erasable programmable read-only memory) technology. In 1967, Dawon Kahng and Simon Sze proposed that floating-gate memory cells, consisting of floating-gate MOSFETs (FGMOS), could be used to produce reprogrammable ROM (read-only memory). Floating-gate memory cells later became the basis for non-volatile memory (NVM) technologies including EPROM, EEPROM (electrically erasable programmable ROM) and flash memory.

=== Types of MOS memory ===
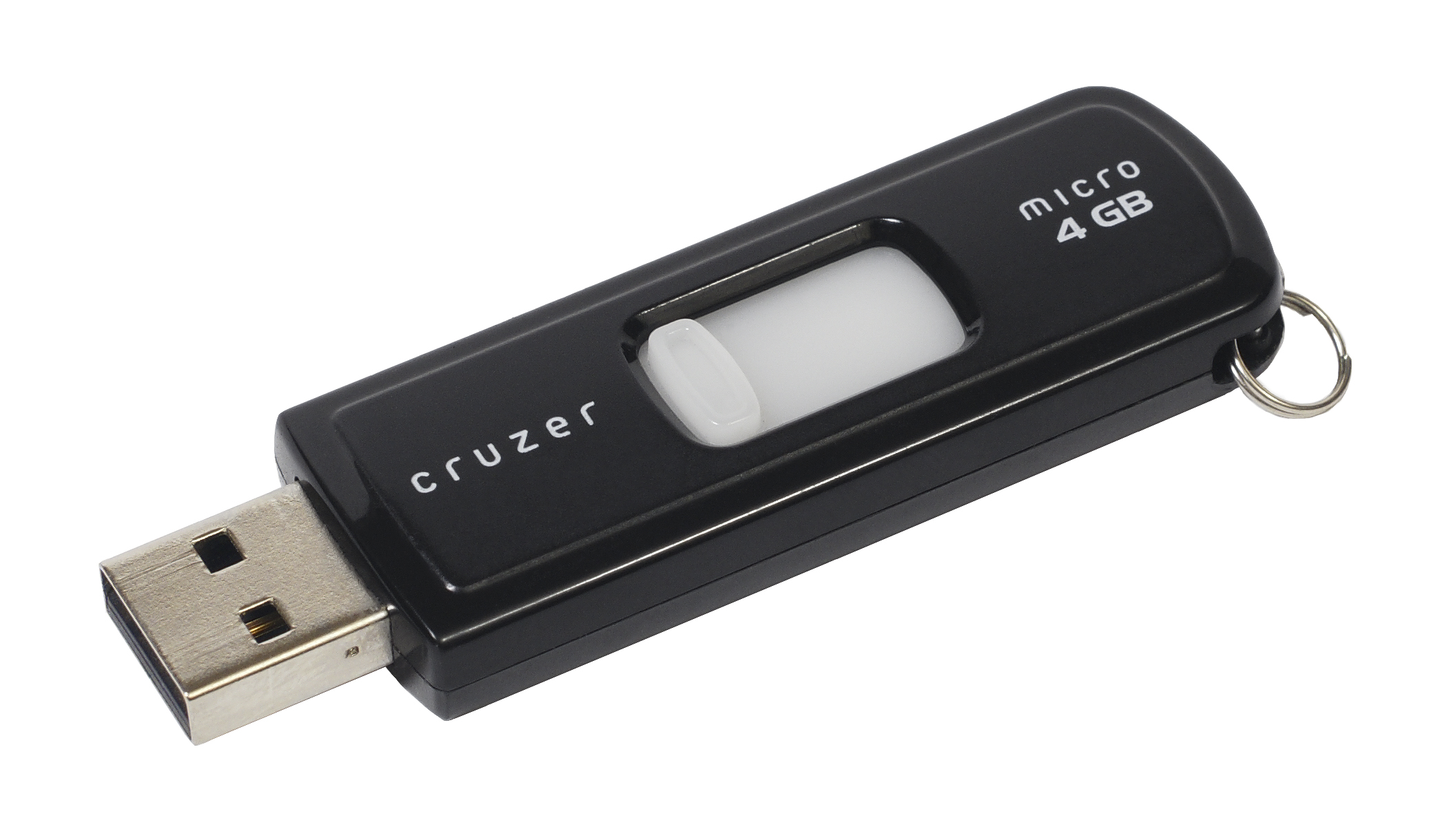
USB flash drive. It uses flash memory, a type of MOS memory consisting of floating-gate MOSFET memory cells.

There are various different types of MOS memory. The following list includes various different MOS memory types.

- Analog memory – analog storage
- BIOS storage – nonvolatile BIOS memory (CMOS memory)
- Cache memory – CPU cache
- Digital memory – digital storage
- Floating-gate memory – non-volatile memory, EPROM, EEPROM
  - Flash memory – solid-state drive (SSD), memory cards (such as SD card and microSD), USB flash drive, charge trap flash (CTF)
- Memory cells – memory chips, data storage, data buffer, code storage, embedded logic, embedded memory, main memory
- Memory registers – shift register
- Random-access memory (RAM) – static RAM (SRAM), dynamic RAM (DRAM), eDRAM, eSRAM, non-volatile RAM (NVRAM), FeRAM, PCRAM, ReRAM
  - Synchronous DRAM (SDRAM) – DDR SDRAM (double data rate SDRAM), RDRAM, XDR DRAM
- Read-only memory (ROM) – mask ROM (MROM) and programmable ROM (PROM)

== MOS sensors ==
A number of MOSFET sensors have been developed, for measuring physical, chemical, biological and environmental parameters. The earliest MOSFET sensors include the open-gate FET (OGFET) introduced by Johannessen in 1970, the ion-sensitive field-effect transistor (ISFET) invented by Piet Bergveld in 1970, the adsorption FET (ADFET) patented by P.F. Cox in 1974, and a hydrogen-sensitive MOSFET demonstrated by I. Lundstrom, M.S. Shivaraman, C.S. Svenson and L. Lundkvist in 1975. The ISFET is a special type of MOSFET with a gate at a certain distance, and where the metal gate is replaced by an ion-sensitive membrane, electrolyte solution and reference electrode.

By the mid-1980s, numerous other MOSFET sensors had been developed, including the gas sensor FET (GASFET), surface accessible FET (SAFET), charge flow transistor (CFT), pressure sensor FET (PRESSFET), chemical field-effect transistor (ChemFET), reference ISFET (REFET), biosensor FET (BioFET), enzyme-modified FET (ENFET) and immunologically modified FET (IMFET). By the early 2000s, BioFET types such as the DNA field-effect transistor (DNAFET), gene-modified FET (GenFET) and cell-potential BioFET (CPFET) had been developed.

The two main types of image sensors used in digital imaging technology are the charge-coupled device (CCD) and the active-pixel sensor (CMOS sensor). Both CCD and CMOS sensors are based on MOS technology, with the CCD based on MOS capacitors and the CMOS sensor based on MOS transistors.

=== Image sensors ===
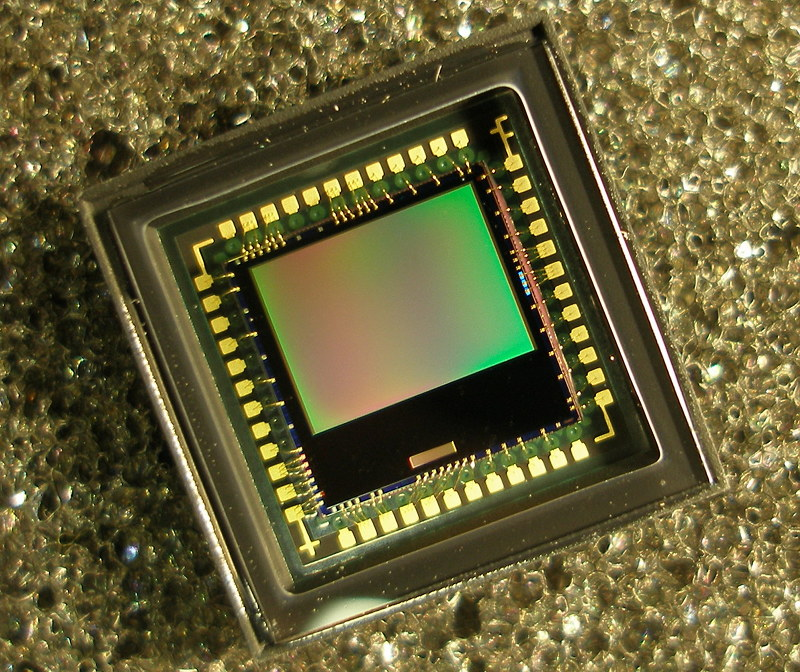
CMOS image sensor. MOS image sensors are the basis for digital cameras, digital imaging, camera phones, action cameras, and optical mouse devices.

MOS technology is the basis for modern image sensors, including the charge-coupled device (CCD) and the CMOS active-pixel sensor (CMOS sensor), used in digital imaging and digital cameras. Willard Boyle and George E. Smith developed the CCD in 1969. While researching the MOS process, they realized that an electric charge was the analogy of the magnetic bubble and that it could be stored on a tiny MOS capacitor. As it was fairly straightforward to fabricate a series of MOS capacitors in a row, they connected a suitable voltage to them so that the charge could be stepped along from one to the next. The CCD is a semiconductor circuit that was later used in the first digital video cameras for television broadcasting.

The MOS active-pixel sensor (APS) was developed by Tsutomu Nakamura at Olympus in 1985. The CMOS active-pixel sensor was later developed by Eric Fossum and his team at NASA's Jet Propulsion Laboratory in the early 1990s.

MOS image sensors are widely used in optical mouse technology. The first optical mouse, invented by Richard F. Lyon at Xerox in 1980, used a 5 μm NMOS sensor chip. Since the first commercial optical mouse, the IntelliMouse introduced in 1999, most optical mouse devices use CMOS sensors.

=== Other sensors ===
MOS sensors, also known as MOSFET sensors, are widely used to measure physical, chemical, biological and environmental parameters. The ion-sensitive field-effect transistor (ISFET), for example, is widely used in biomedical applications.

MOSFETs are also widely used in microelectromechanical systems (MEMS), as silicon MOSFETs could interact and communicate with the surroundings and process things such as chemicals, motions and light. An early example of a MEMS device is the resonant-gate transistor, an adaptation of the MOSFET, developed by Harvey C. Nathanson in 1965.

Common applications of other MOS sensors include the following.

- Audio sensor
- Biosensors – BioFET, biotechnology
- Biomedical applications – detection of DNA hybridization, biomarker detection from blood, antibody detection, glucose measurement, pH sensing, genetic technology
- Chemical sensors
- Environmental sensors
- Gas detectors – carbon monoxide, sulfur dioxide, hydrogen sulfide and ammonia sensors
- Intelligent sensors
- Microelectromechanical systems (MEMS)
- Monitoring sensors – house monitoring, office and agriculture monitoring, temperature, humidity, air pollution, fire, health, security, lighting, weather monitoring (rain, wind, lightning, storms)
  - Traffic monitoring sensors
- Physical sensors
- Pressure sensors – barometric air pressure (BAP) sensor
- Wireless sensor network (WSN)

== Power MOSFET ==
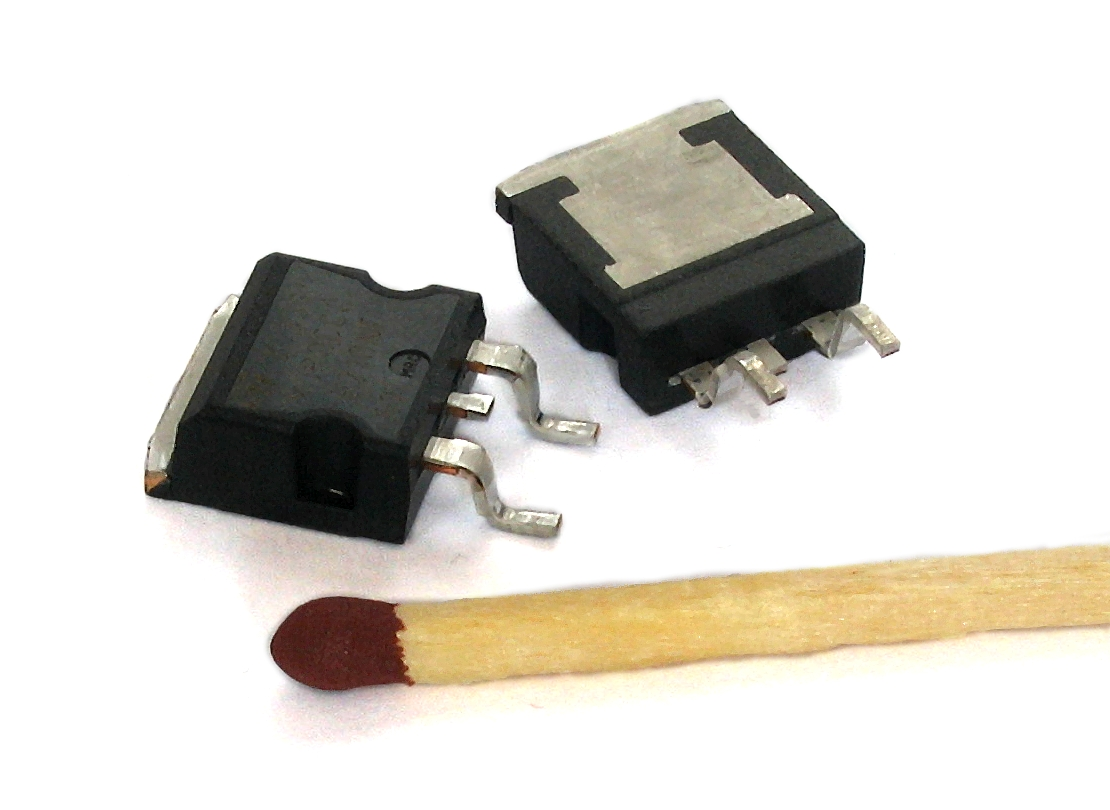
Two power MOSFETs in D2PAK surface-mount packages. Operating as switches, each of these components can sustain a blocking voltage of 120 V in the off state, and can conduct a continuous current of 30 A in the on state, dissipating up to about 100 W and controlling a load of over 2000 W. A matchstick is pictured for scale.

The power MOSFET, which is commonly used in power electronics, was developed in the early 1970s. The power MOSFET enables low gate drive power, fast switching speed, and advanced paralleling capability.

The power MOSFET is the most widely used power device in the world. Advantages over bipolar junction transistors in power electronics include MOSFETs not requiring a continuous flow of drive current to remain in the ON state, offering higher switching speeds, lower switching power losses, lower on-resistances, and reduced susceptibility to thermal runaway. The power MOSFET had an impact on power supplies, enabling higher operating frequencies, size and weight reduction, and increased volume production.

Switching power supplies are the most common applications for power MOSFETs. They are also widely used for MOS RF power amplifiers, which enabled the transition of mobile networks from analog to digital in the 1990s. This led to the wide proliferation of wireless mobile networks, which revolutionised telecommunications systems. The LDMOS in particular is the most widely used power amplifier in mobile networks such as 2G, 3G, 4G and 5G, as well as broadcasting and amateur radio. Over 50 billion discrete power MOSFETs are shipped annually, as of 2018. They are widely used for automotive, industrial and communications systems in particular. Power MOSFETs are commonly used in automotive electronics, particularly as switching devices in electronic control units, and as power converters in modern electric vehicles. The insulated-gate bipolar transistor (IGBT), a hybrid MOS-bipolar transistor, is also used for a wide variety of applications.

LDMOS, a power MOSFET with lateral structure, is commonly used in high-end audio amplifiers and high-power PA systems. Their advantage is a better behaviour in the saturated region (corresponding to the linear region of a bipolar transistor) than the vertical MOSFETs. Vertical MOSFETs are designed for switching applications.

=== DMOS and VMOS ===
Power MOSFETs, including DMOS, LDMOS and VMOS devices, are commonly used for a wide range of other applications, which include the following.

- Agriculture
- Amplifiers – class AB peak power amplifier (PPA), class-D amplifier, RF power amplifier, video amplifier
- Analog electronics
- Audio power amplifiers – analog audio, digital audio
- Diode reverse recovery
- Electric power conversion – AC-DC converters, DC-to-DC converters, buck converters, voltage converters, synchronous converters
  - Synchronous rectification (SR) – integrated Schottky and pseudo-Schottky operations, SR flyback converters, SR forward converters
  - Inverters – DC/AC power inverters
- Electronic signal processing – pulse train, square waves, pulse-width modulation (PWM)
- Industrial technology – instrumentation, electronic test equipment applications, power tools, forklifts, mining vehicles, measurement, monitoring, pumps, relay drivers
  - 3D printing
  - Electric power distribution – solid-state power switch (SSPS) and circuit breakers
  - High-voltage electronics – high-voltage MOSFET (HV MOSFET), high-voltage electronic systems, analog high-voltage circuits
  - Low-voltage electronics – low-voltage motor drives, low-voltage motor controllers
- Medical electronics – medical devices
- Multi-chip module (MCM)
- Power electronics – commutation, gate drivers, load switching, power-factor correction (PFC), power management, solid-state relay (SSR)
  - Driver circuits – stepper motors
  - Electric motors – motor drives, stepper motor, DC motor, AC motor, AC/DC motor
  - Power control – pulse-width modulation (PWM), controlled power in everyday devices
  - Power integrated circuit (power IC) chips – bipolar–CMOS–DMOS (BCD), smart power IC, motor controller, application-specific standard product (ASSP)
  - Power-system protection – electrostatic discharge (ESD) protection, overvoltage protection, short circuit protection, temperature protection
  - Quadrant III operations – Schottky effect
- Power supplies – power supply unit (PSU), short-circuit protection (SCP)
  - Switched-mode power supply (SMPS) – synchronous rectifier, Vienna rectifier
  - Uninterruptible power supply (UPS) – active rectification, bridge rectifier
- Printed circuit board (PCB) layouts
- Solar energy
  - Solar power – solar cell, solar panel, rechargeable battery applications
  - Solar inverters – solar micro-inverter
- Voltage regulators – voltage regulator module (VRM)

=== RF DMOS ===
RF DMOS, also known as RF power MOSFET, is a type of DMOS power transistor designed for radio-frequency (RF) applications. It is used in various radio and RF applications, which include the following.

- Defrosting
- Excitation
- FM broadcasting
- High frequency (HF) technology – HF transceiver, very high frequency (VHF), ultra high frequency (UHF)
- Industrial, Scientific and Medical band (ISM band) applications – RF cavity technology
  - Plasma technology – plasma-enhanced chemical vapor deposition (PECVD), plasma sputtering, RF plasma signal generator
- Large-signal applications
- Laser drivers – carbon dioxide laser (CO_{2} laser) driver
- Medical technology – medical devices
  - Medical imaging – magnetic resonance imaging (MRI)
- Pulse applications
- RF heating

== Consumer electronics ==
MOSFETs are fundamental to the consumer electronics industry. According to Colinge, numerous consumer electronics would not exist without the MOSFET, such as digital wristwatches, pocket calculators, and video games, for example.

MOSFETs are commonly used for a wide range of consumer electronics, which include the following devices listed. Computers or telecommunication devices (such as phones) are not included here, but are listed separately in the Information and communications technology (ICT) section below.

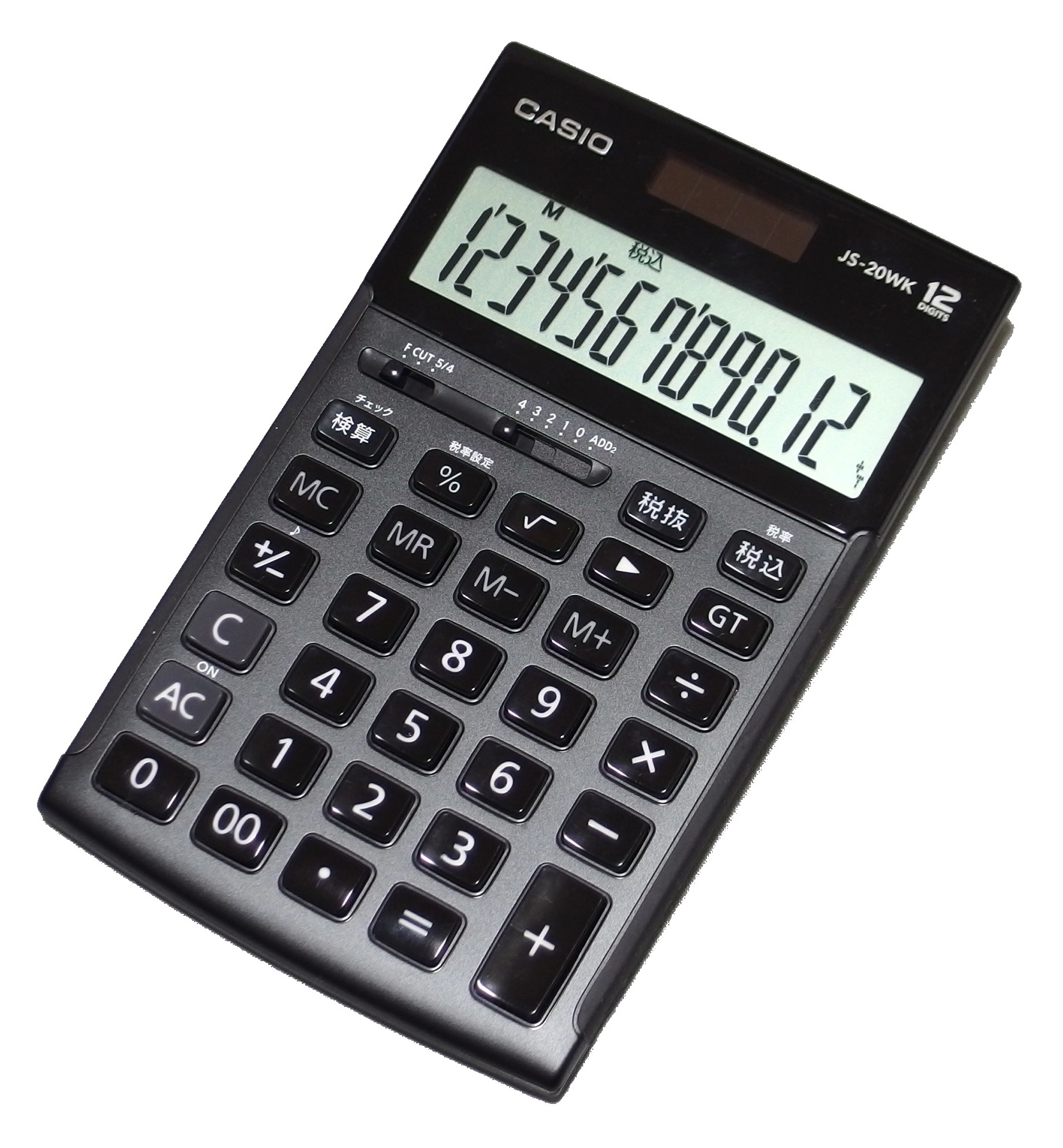
Casio pocket calculator with liquid-crystal display (LCD). MOSFETs are the basis for pocket calculators and LCDs.

- Calculators – handheld calculator, pocket calculator
- Disk storage
  - Disk buffer cache – disk drives, optical disc drives (DVD and CD-ROM drives), optical disc players (CD and DVD players)
  - Hard drives – spindle speed control, disk buffer cache
- Electric clocks – digital clocks
  - Watches – electronic wristwatch, quartz watch digital watch, digital wristwatch,
- Electronic voting machine
- Entertainment
  - Airsoft – airsoft gun
  - Toys – electronic toys
- Gadgets – electric meter reader, electronic key, electronic lock
- Gate drivers – air conditioner, fan, sewing machine
- Heating – electric heating, heating control system, RF heating
- Home appliances
- Kitchen appliances – cooker, food processor, toaster, blender
  - RF energy appliances – cooking appliances, defrosting, freezer, oven, refrigerator, microwave cooking
- Lighting – dimmable light switch, fluorescent lamp, electrical ballast, light dimmer
  - Smart lighting – wireless light switch
- Light-emitting diode (LED) technology – dimmable LED driver circuits (such as for LED lamps and LED flashlights)
- Payment card technology – credit card, smart card
  - Card readers – embossed credit card reader, magnetic stripe card reader
- Portable electronics
- RF energy technology – smart appliances
- Smart devices – smartwatch

=== Pocket calculators ===
One of the earliest influential consumer electronic products enabled by MOS LSI circuits was the electronic pocket calculator, as MOS LSI technology enabled large amounts of computational capability in small packages. In 1965, the Victor 3900 desktop calculator was the first MOS LSI calculator, with 29 MOS LSI chips. In 1967 the Texas Instruments Cal-Tech was the first prototype electronic handheld calculator, with three MOS LSI chips, and it was later released as the Canon Pocketronic in 1970. The Sharp QT-8D desktop calculator was the first mass-produced LSI MOS calculator in 1969, and the Sharp EL-8 which used four MOS LSI chips was the first commercial electronic handheld calculator in 1970. The first true electronic pocket calculator was the Busicom LE-120A HANDY LE, which used a single MOS LSI calculator-on-a-chip from Mostek, and was released in 1971. By 1972, MOS LSI circuits were commercialized for numerous other applications.

=== Audio-visual (AV) media ===
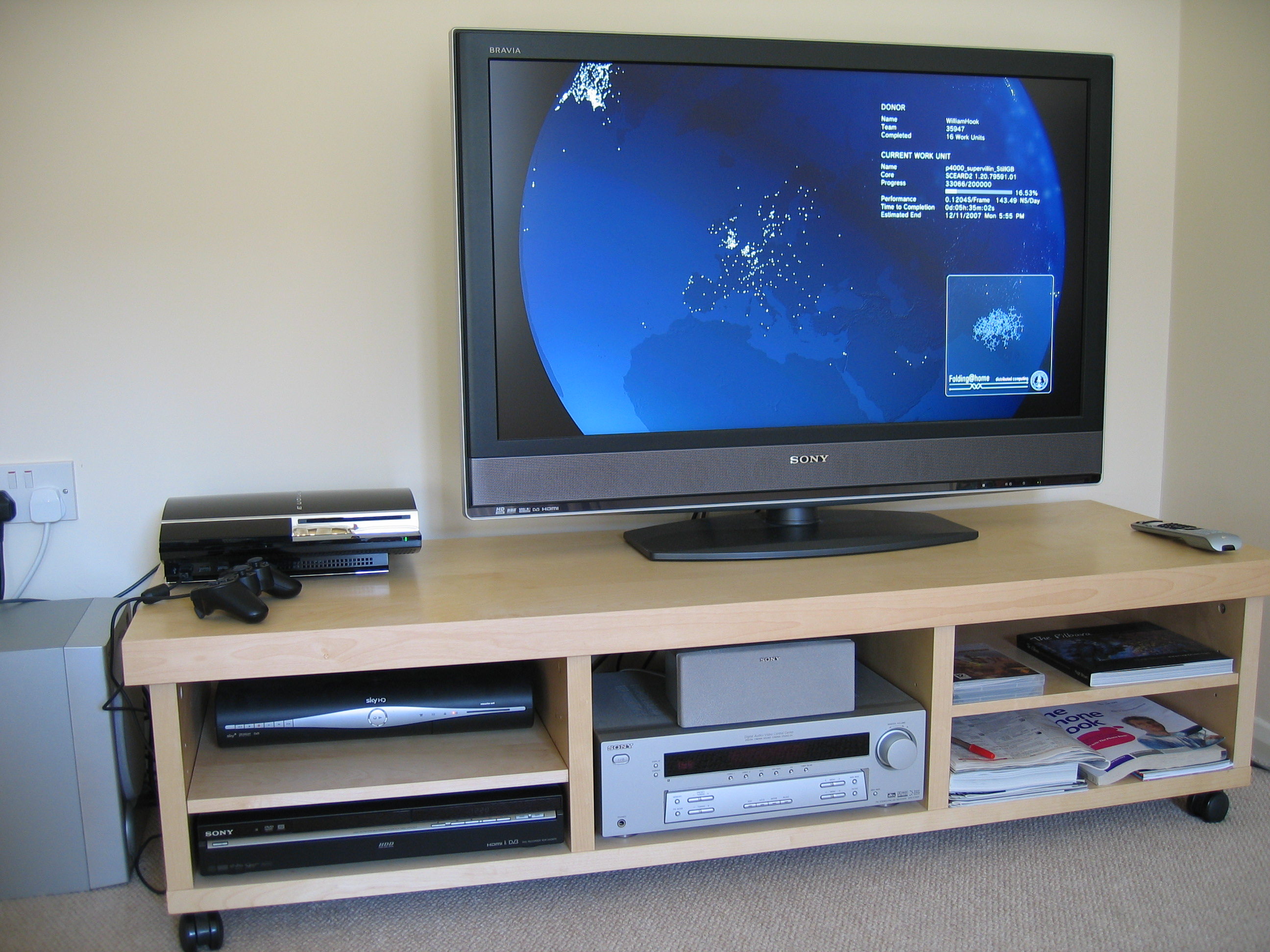
Sony home cinema setup, with full HD LCD television, digital TV set-top box, DVD player, PlayStation 3 video game console, and loudspeakers. MOSFETs are used in all of these consumer electronic devices.

MOSFETs are commonly used for a wide range of audio-visual (AV) media technologies, which include the following list of applications.

- Audio technology – loudspeaker, public announcement (PA) system, high-fidelity (hi‑fi), microphone
  - Digital audio – audio coding, sound chip, audio codec, pulse-code modulation (PCM), μ-law algorithm, audio filter, anti-aliasing filter, low-pass filter, pulse-density modulation (PDM)
  - Electronic musical instruments – electronic organ
  - Speech processing – speech coding, speech digitization, voice synthesis/simulation, speech recognition, voice data storage
- Cameras – video camera camcorder, color video camera
  - Digital cameras – action camera, webcam, HD video camera
- Digital media
  - Digital cinema – digital cinematography and digital movie camera
  - Digital imaging – digital image and digital photography
  - Digital video – digital video processing, HD video
- Display technology – electronic visual displays, flat-panel displays
  - Display drivers – EL display, plasma display, vacuum fluorescent display and LED drivers
  - Light-emitting diode (LED) displays – OLED
  - Liquid-crystal display (LCD) – active-matrix LCD (AM LCD), thin-film transistor LCD (TFT LCD), LCD television (LCD TV), in-plane switching (IPS) panel, ferroelectric liquid crystal display (FLCD), liquid crystal on silicon (LCoS)
  - Television (TV) – TV receiver, TV receiver circuits, large-screen television technology, terrestrial broadcast, TV tuner, color TV video-signal generator, remote control, color TV, digital TV, portable television, set-top box
  - Touchscreens – capacitive sensing, multi-touch, DSP touch processor, ASIC touch controller
- Electronic games – arcade game, handheld electronic game
  - Video games – game console, game controller, ROM cartridge, full motion video, online game, video game audio, video game graphics
- Entertainment devices
- Flexible electronics – electronic reader (e-reader)
  - Flexible displays – bendable display technology, electronic paper (e-paper)
- Home entertainment – home video
- Image processing – image processor
- Multimedia
- Optical disc players – CD player, DVD player
- Portable media players – Walkman, portable CD player, portable video player, MP3 player
- Video – video editing
- Video decoder chips – for video and teletext decoding

=== Power MOSFET applications ===
Power MOSFETs are commonly used for a wide range of consumer electronics. Power MOSFETs are widely used in the following consumer applications.

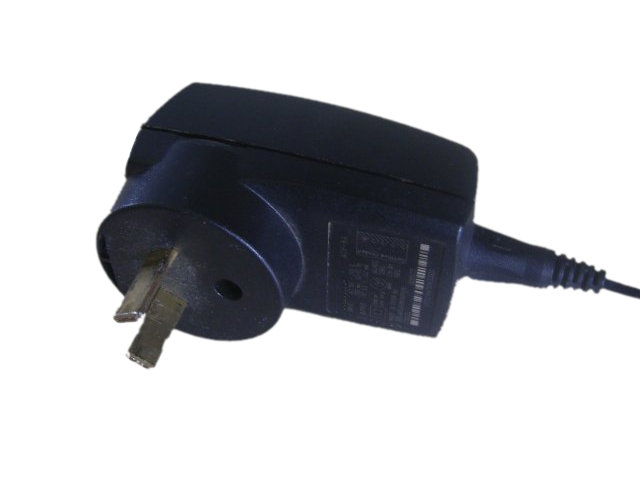
Mobile phone battery charger, a type of switched-mode power supply (SMPS) AC adapter. Power MOSFETs are widely used in most SMPS power supplies and mobile device AC adapters.

- Adapters – AC adapter, automatic supply voltage adapters
- Air conditioning (AC)
- Audio technology – loudspeakers, speaker drivers, high-fidelity (hi-fi) equipment, public address system, electronic musical instruments, power supplies
- Cameras – single-lens reflex camera (SLR), autofocus, rewind, digital camera
- Display technology
  - Flat-panel display (FPD) – display drivers for liquid-crystal display (LCD) and plasma display
  - Television (TV) – TV circuits, TV broadcasting, digital television (DTV), power supplies
- Electric battery technology – battery chargers, rechargeable batteries, reverse battery protection
  - Battery-powered applications – mobile devices with long battery life
  - Lithium-ion battery (LIB) technology – battery management system (BMS), battery protection, disconnect switches
- Electric fan
- Electric razors
- Heating – electric heating, RF heating
- Home appliances – major appliances, smart appliances
  - RF energy appliances – kitchen appliances, cooking appliances, defrosting, freezer, refrigerator, oven, microwave cooking
- Home entertainment equipment
- Internet – critical Internet infrastructure, communications infrastructure, computer servers, World Wide Web (WWW), Internet of things (IoT)
- Lighting – dimmable light switch, LED lighting, light bulbs
  - Smart lighting – wireless light switch
- Light-emitting diode (LED) technology – LED driver circuits, LED lamps, LED flashlights, LED bulb, LED dimmers

== Information and communications technology (ICT) ==
MOSFETs are fundamental to information and communications technology (ICT), including modern computers, modern computing, telecommunications, the communications infrastructure, the Internet, digital telephony, Wireless telecommunications, and mobile networks. According to Colinge, the modern computer industry and digital telecommunication systems would not exist without the MOSFET. Advances in MOS technology has been the most important contributing factor in the rapid rise of network bandwidth in telecommunication networks, with bandwidth doubling every 18 months, from bits per second to terabits per second (Edholm's law).

=== Computers ===
MOSFETs are commonly used in a wide range of computers and computing applications, which include the following.

- Business machines
- Computer industry – PC market
- Computer graphics – graphics card
  - Video memory – character generator, framebuffer, video RAM (VRAM), synchronous graphics RAM (SGRAM), GDDR SDRAM
- Computer hardware – computer processor, computer memory, computer data storage, computer power supply, instrument control, motherboard, voltage regulator module (VRM), overclocking
  - Controllers – display controller, peripheral controller, tape drive control, ATA controller, keyboard controller
  - Peripherals – display monitor, computer keyboard, optical mouse
  - Computer printers – laser printer
- Digital computers – computer terminals, cloud computing, mainframes, multimedia computers, supercomputers, server computers, workstations
  - Personal computer (PC) – desktop computer, notebook computer
- Computer science
  - Artificial intelligence (AI) – neural network, artificial neural network (ANN), neural processing unit, feedback and feedforward neural networks, maze-solving algorithm
- Computer vision – optical character recognition (OCR), augmented reality (AR), computer stereo vision, virtual reality (VR)
- Data centers
- Information technology (IT)
- Mobile devices – mobile computers, handheld PC, personal digital assistant (PDA)
  - Smart devices – laptop, portable computer, tablet computer
- Parallel computing – fine-grained parallelism
- Word processors

=== Telecommunications ===
Apple iPhone smartphone (2007). MOSFETs are the basis for smartphones, each typically containing billions of MOSFETs.

MOSFETs are commonly used in a wide range of telecommunications, which include the following applications.

- Communication systems – broadband, data transmission, digital telecommunication, digital loop carriers, fibre-optic communication, packet switching, telecommunication circuits
- Mobile devices – mobile communication, pager
  - Cellular networks – cellular voice and data traffic, digital networks, GSM, 2G, 3G, 4G, 5G
  - Mobile phones
  - Smartphones – application processor, flash memory, cellular modem, RF transceiver, CMOS image sensor, power management IC, display driver, wireless communication, sound chip, gyroscope, touchscreen controller
- Quantum communication – quantum teleportation, quantum information processing
- Telecommunications equipment – fax, modem, crosspoint switch, mail sorter machine, multimeter, multiplexer, push-button signal receiver, optical fiber circuits, personal communications device
- Telecommunication networks
  - Internet – Internet infrastructure, the Web, broadband Internet, Internet of things, online communication, online service, search engine, social media, social communications infrastructure
  - Telephone networks – public switched telephone network (PSTN), electronic switching system, telephone exchange, private branch exchange, key telephone system, telephone loop extender, Digital switching network, Integrated Services Digital Network (ISDN)
- Telephony – telephone switching, digital telephony, voice mail, digital tapeless answering machine, pair gain multiplexer
  - Telephones – push-button telephone, digital telephone, speed dial, touch-tone phone, payphone, cordless telephone, cell phone, digital phone, digital telephone, camera phone, videophone
- Teleprinters
- Wireless technology – wireless networks, wireless communication, base stations, routers, transceivers, baseband processors, end-user terminals, ALOHAnet, Bluetooth, Wi-Fi, satellite communication, GPS, GPS receiver, near-field communication, DECT, WLAN
  - Radio technology – radio-frequency (RF) technology, RF engineering, RF power amplifier, radio-frequency communication, radio network, FM radio, mobile radio, radio transceiver, RF CMOS, RF switch, millimetre wave, digital radio, packet radio, software-defined radio (SDR), car radio, radio-frequency identification, radio-controlled model
- Radar

=== Power MOSFET applications ===
- Computers
  - Computer hardware – motherboard, video card, overclocking, computer bus
  - Computer power – power supply unit (PSU), central processing unit (CPU) power supply
  - Computing – mobile computing,
  - Mobile devices – handheld computers, mobile computer, notebook computer, tablet computer
  - Peripherals – printers
- Data storage
  - Embedded non-volatile memory (NVM) – electrically erasable programmable ROM (EEPROM), flash memory
  - Hard disk drive (HDD) technology – motor drive, spindle speed control
- Internet – critical Internet infrastructure, communications infrastructure, computer servers, World Wide Web (WWW), Internet of things (IoT)
- Mobile devices – mobile communication, mobile computing, portable applications, smartphone
  - Mobile networks – Global System for Mobile Communications (GSM), 2G, 3G, 4G, 5G
  - Mobile phones – phone charger
- Radio – analog radio, digital radio, mobile radio, digital mobile radio (DMR)
  - Radio-frequency (RF) technology – RF circuits, radar
  - RF energy technology
- Telecommunications – telecommunications networks, data transmission, telecommunication circuits, military communications, RF power amplifier
  - Cellular networks – cellular voice and data traffic, transceivers, base station modules, routers
  - Telecommunications equipment
- Wireless technology – wireless networks, base stations, routers, transceivers, satellite communication, wideband

== Insulated-gate bipolar transistor (IGBT) ==
The insulated-gate bipolar transistor (IGBT) is a power transistor with characteristics of both a MOSFET and bipolar junction transistor (BJT). As of 2010, the IGBT is the second most widely used power transistor, after the power MOSFET. The IGBT accounts for 27% of the power transistor market, second only to the power MOSFET (53%), and ahead of the RF amplifier (11%) and bipolar junction transistor (9%). The IGBT is widely used in consumer electronics, industrial technology, the energy sector, aerospace electronic devices, and transportation.

The IGBT is widely used in the following applications.

- Consumer electronics – battery charger, multi-function printer (MFP), power-factor correction (PFC)
  - Household appliances – home appliance control, compressor
  - Major appliances – microwave ovens, induction cooking, induction cooking range, dishwashers, heat pumps, air conditioning, refrigerators, washing machines
  - Small appliances – vacuum cleaners, induction cooktops, rice cookers, food processors (blenders, juicers, mixers)
- Defense technology – naval frequency changers, shunt active power filters, electric boats, warships, aircraft carriers, nuclear submarines, diesel-electric submarines, military vehicles, military jets, missile defense, pulsed power
- Display technology
  - Flat-panel display (FPD) – plasma display
  - Television (TV) – cathode-ray tube (CRT) TV sets, plasma TV sets, voltage regulator circuits
- Heat pump
- High-voltage direct current (HVDC) – telecommunications, data centers
- Industrial technology – adjustable-speed drive (ASD), pulse-width modulation (PWM), factory automation, robotics, electric heating, milling machines, drilling machines, metal industry, paper mills, electrostatic precipitator (ESP), textile mills, mining, digging excavations
  - Alternative energy systems – renewable energy technology
  - Coal-fired power plants – reduces annual carbon dioxide emissions by over 1 trillion pounds
  - Electric motor drives – braking chopper
  - Electric power transmission systems
  - Energy storage
  - Solar power – solar panel, solar inverter, solar-assisted heat pump (SAHP)
  - Welding – welding power supply
- Inverters – three phase inverter, solar inverter
- Lighting – incandescent lamps, light-emitting diode (LED), strobe light, flashlights, xenon short-arc lamps, stroboscopes, dimmers, rapid thermal annealing
  - Fluorescent lighting – compact fluorescent lamps, which reduce annual power consumption by an estimated 30 gigawatts
- Medical equipment – uninterruptible power supplies, computed tomography (CT) scanners, defibrillators, automated external defibrillator (AED), X-ray machines, magnetic resonance imaging (MRI), medical ultrasonography (ultrasound), synchrotron, medical lasers
- Microwave technology
- Motor control
- Power supplies – switched-mode power supply (SMPS), uninterruptible power supply (UPS)
- Switch
- Variable-frequency drive (VFD) – reduces annual power consumption by an estimated 70 gigawatts

== Quantum physics ==
=== 2D electron gas and quantum Hall effect ===
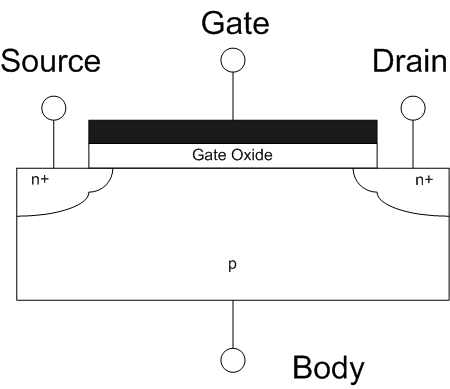
A two-dimensional electron gas (2DEG) is present when a MOSFET is in inversion mode, and is found directly beneath the gate oxide.

In quantum physics and quantum mechanics, the MOSFET is the basis for two-dimensional electron gas (2DEG) and the quantum Hall effect. The MOSFET enables physicists to study electron behavior in a two-dimensional gas, called a two-dimensional electron gas. In a MOSFET, conduction electrons travel in a thin surface layer, and a "gate" voltage controls the number of charge carriers in this layer. This allows researchers to explore quantum effects by operating high-purity MOSFETs at liquid helium temperatures.

In 1978, the Gakushuin University researchers Jun-ichi Wakabayashi and Shinji Kawaji observed the Hall effect in experiments carried out on the inversion layer of MOSFETs. In 1980, Klaus von Klitzing, working at the high magnetic field laboratory in Grenoble with silicon-based MOSFET samples developed by Michael Pepper and Gerhard Dorda, made the unexpected discovery of the quantum Hall effect.

=== Quantum technology ===
The MOSFET is used in quantum technology. A quantum field-effect transistor (QFET) or quantum well field-effect transistor (QWFET) is a type of MOSFET that takes advantage of quantum tunneling to greatly increase the speed of transistor operation.

== Transportation ==
MOSFETs are widely used in transportation. For example, they are commonly used for automotive electronics in the automotive industry. MOS technology is commonly used for a wide range of vehicles and transportation, which include the following applications.

- Aircraft – on-board computer, aircraft flight control system, electric aircraft
- Construction vehicles – forklift, mining vehicles
- Electric vehicle (EV)
- Gasoline-powered vehicles
- Hybrid electric vehicle (HEV)
- Gate drivers – automatic door, electric gate, elevator, escalator, agricultural vehicles, commercial vehicles, electric bus (e-bus)
- Marine propulsion
- Rail transport – railway locomotive, bullet trains, electric tram, subway train, airport train, electric locomotive, diesel–electric locomotive, high-speed rail (HSR)
- Traffic monitoring sensors – car speed, traffic jams, traffic accidents
- Space industry – spacecraft, satellite, space research, space exploration, Interplanetary Monitoring Platform (IMP), Apollo program, Moon landings, space monitoring (Moon, Sun, stars, meteorites, astronomical phenomena)

=== Automotive industry ===
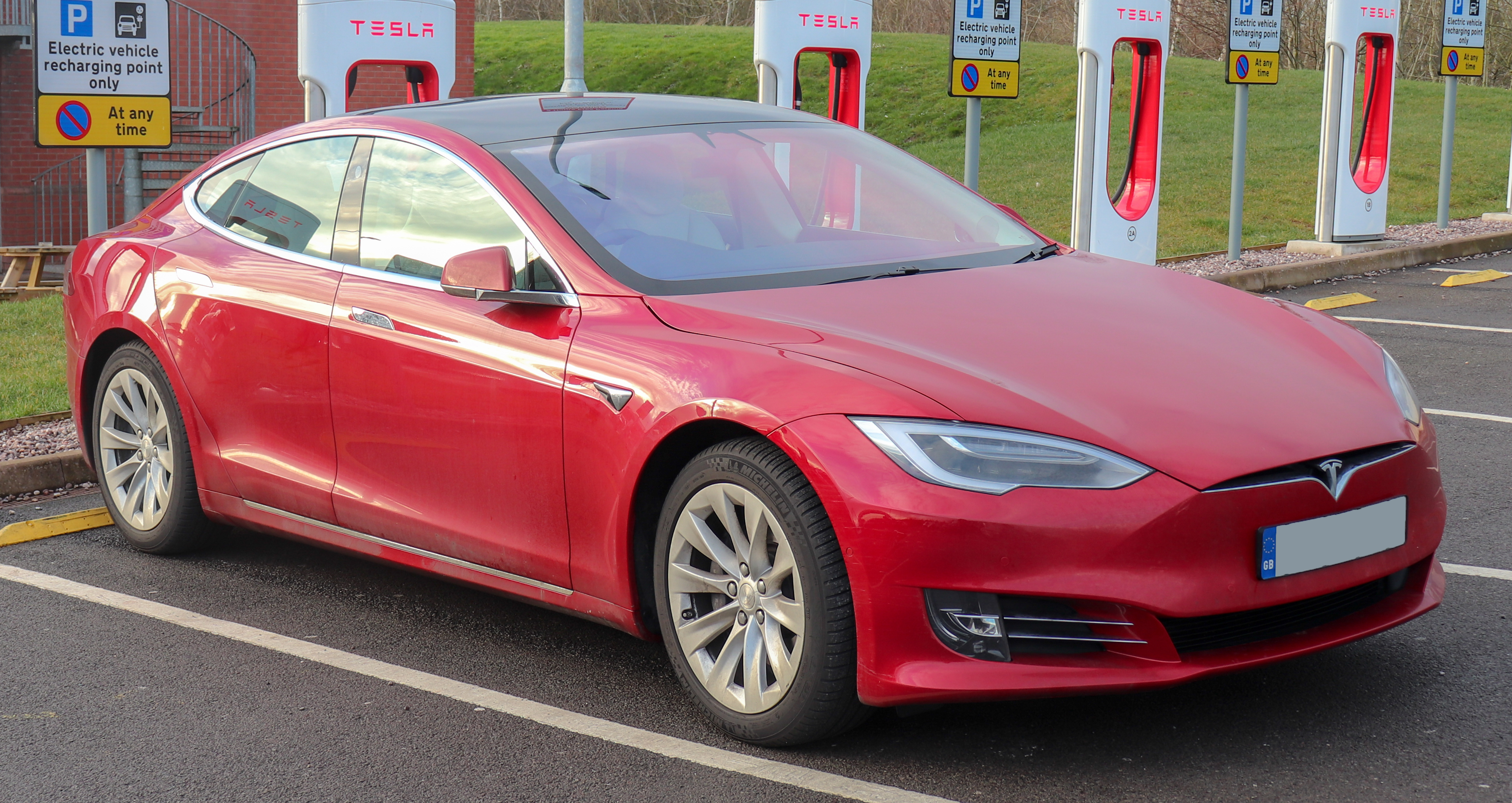
Tesla Model S electric car. MOSFETs are the basis for modern electric road vehicles.

MOSFETs are widely used in the automotive industry, particularly for automotive electronics in motor vehicles. Automotive applications include the following.

- Adaptive cruise control (ACC)
- Airbag
- Automobiles
- Automotive radar
- Anti-lock braking system (ABS) – ABS valves
- Automotive lighting, barometric air pressure (BAP) sensor, body control module (BCM), car seat comfort system, daytime running light (DRL), fuel injection, fuel vapors, DC motor control, brushless DC (BLDC) motor control, start-stop system
- Cars – car alarm, car maintenance monitor, electric car
  - Smart cars – self-driving car
- Drivers – load driver, relay driver
- Electronic control unit (ECU) – engine control unit, transmission control unit (TCU)
- Electronic Skid Prevention (ESP)
- Motor controller
- Heating, ventilation, and air conditioning
- Trucks

=== Power MOSFET applications ===
Power MOSFETs are widely used in transportation technology, which includes the following vehicles.

- Electric vehicle (EV) – hybrid electric vehicle (HEV), battery-driven airport vehicle, Segway transport, electric skateboard, motorized wheelchair, on-board DC–DC converter
  - Auxiliary gate drivers – fans, pumps, HVAC, heat pump, PTC heater
  - Light electric vehicle (LEV) – electric forklift (e-forklift), electric golf cart (e-golf cart), electric motorbike (e-motorbike), light utility vehicle (LUV), low-speed electric vehicle (LSEV), electric bike (e-bike), electric rickshaw (e-rickshaw), electric three-wheeler (e-three-wheeler), electric scooter (e-scooter)
  - On-board battery charger – Wireless in-cabin phone charger
- Aircraft
  - Airplane – electrical relay
- Space industry – space research, space monitoring (Moon, Sun, stars, meteorites, astronomical phenomena)
  - Spacecraft – satellites, space exploration
- Avionics

In the automotive industry, power MOSFETs are widely used in automotive electronics, which include the following.

- Airbags – Supplementary Restraint System (SRS), squib driver system (with safety redundancy)
- Automotive safety – active suspension control system, electric brake booster, electric power-steering (EPS), fail-operational EPS, reversible seatbelt pre-tensioner
- Brakes – anti-lock braking system (ABS), brake fluid pressure control, emergency brake assist (EBA), vehicle stability control (VSC)
  - Solenoid valve drivers – ABS (with repeated avalanche operation)
- Clutch – dual-clutch transmission (DCT)
  - Clutch control – electric clutch control, hydraulic clutch control
- Electrical load drivers – electric motors, solenoids, ignition coils, relays, heaters, lamps
- Electronic control unit (ECU) – transmission control unit (TCU)
  - Engine control unit – air pump, carburetor, idle speed, ignition timing, valve, torque converter
  - Motor control – mirrors, windscreen wipers, car seat positioning
- Electronic locks – power door locks, fuel filler cap lock, mirror lock, steering-wheel lock
- Fuel injection – gasoline direct injection, gasoline port injection, fuel injection valves
- Headrest adjustment
- Heating, ventilation, and air conditioning (HVAC) – HVAC control system
  - Heaters – auxiliary heater, diesel engine, electric heater, preheater
- Motor vehicles – automobiles, cars, trucks, smart cars
  - Electric vehicle (EV) and hybrid electric vehicle (HEV) – auxiliary inverter, traction motor inverter, battery charger, high-voltage (HV), low-voltage (LV), EV charging
- Powertrain applications – alternator, fans, micro-hybrid
  - Pumps – electric water pump, fuel pump, auxiliary pumps, on-board EV charging
- Start-stop system

=== IGBT applications ===
The insulated-gate bipolar transistor (IGBT) is a power transistor with characteristics of both a MOSFET and bipolar junction transistor (BJT). IGBTs are widely used in the following transportation applications.

- Aircraft – electric aircraft, carrier-based aircraft, Electromagnetic Aircraft Launch System (EALS)
- Drive train in electric cars and hybrid cars – reduces urban pollution
- Electric vehicle (EV) – hybrid electric vehicle (HEV), electric transit bus, trolley
- Electronic ignition systems
- EV charging – DC–DC converter, EV charging station
- Gasoline-powered vehicles
- Marine propulsion
- Motor vehicles – cars, electric street cars
- Rail transport – railway locomotives, bullet trains, electric tram, subway train, airport train, electric locomotive, diesel–electric locomotive, high-speed rail (HSR)

=== Space industry ===
Cassini–Huygens spacecraft to Saturn used MOSFET power switch devices for power distribution.

In the space industry, MOSFET devices were adopted by NASA for space research in 1964, for its Interplanetary Monitoring Platform (IMP) program and Explorers space exploration program. The use of MOSFETs was a major step forward in the electronics design of spacecraft and satellites. The IMP D (Explorer 33), launched in 1966, was the first spacecraft to use the MOSFET. Data gathered by IMP spacecraft and satellites were used to support the Apollo program, enabling the first crewed Moon landing with the Apollo 11 mission in 1969.

The Cassini–Huygens to Saturn in 1997 had spacecraft power distribution accomplished 192 solid-state power switch (SSPS) devices, which also functioned as circuit breakers in the event of an overload condition. The switches were developed from a combination of two semiconductor devices with switching capabilities: the MOSFET and the ASIC (application-specific integrated circuit). This combination resulted in advanced power switches that had better performance characteristics than traditional mechanical switches.

== Other applications ==
MOSFETs are commonly used for a wide range of other applications, which include the following.

- Accelerometer
- Alternative energy systems – renewable energy technology
  - Solar power – solar cells, solar battery applications
- Amplifiers – Differential amplifiers, op-amp, video amplifier
- Analog electronics – analog circuit, analog amplifier, comparator, integrator, summer, multiplier, analog filter, inverter
- Biomedical engineering
- Business – banking, Internet commerce
- Capacitors – MOS capacitor, switched capacitor, capacitor filter
- Cash registers
- CMOS circuits – phase-locked loop, CMOS inverter
- Digital electronics – digital circuits
- Electronics industry – semiconductor industry
- Electronic signal processing – digital signal processing, digital signal processor, analog signal processing, transducer, mixed-signal, data conversion, pulse train, square waves
  - Analog-to-digital converter (ADC) – delta-sigma, time-interleaved ADC
  - Digital-to-analog converter (DAC) – CD players
- Electronic switch
- Environmental technology – environmental sensors
- Industrial technology – instrumentation, CAD, industrial control system, test gear applications, coal-fired power plants
  - Automation – motion control
  - Control systems – industrial control system, automated machine control system
  - Electric motor drives – braking chopper
  - Manufacturing
  - Gate drivers – compressor, hydraulic pump inverter, robotics, servo motor
- Laser drivers
- Medical industry – medical imaging (such as dental imaging) portable medical devices (such as hearing aid and implantable heart control), medical technology
- Microtechnology – microelectronics, logic circuits, microelectromechanical systems (MEMS)
- Military technology – data storage, military communication, defense monitoring sensors
- Nanotechnology – nanoelectronics
- Optical technology – optoelectronics and optical communication
  - Photonics – silicon photonics
- Power-system protection – electrostatic discharge (ESD) protection, overvoltage protection, short circuit protection, temperature protection
- Printing technology – 3D printing
- Quality-of-life improvements
- Resistors – variable resistor
- Robotics
- Silicon semiconductor devices – silicon integrated circuit (IC) chips
- Surveillance industry
- X-ray – X-ray detector, digital radiography, flat-panel detector
- Other uses – drones, robots, telescopic lens
