= MOSFET gate driver =

Circuit in transistors

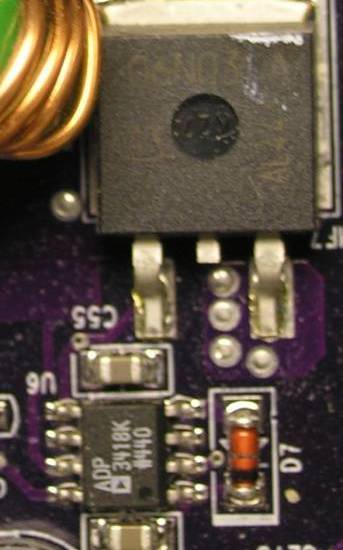
ADP3418 MOSFET gate driver on a printed circuit board

MOSFET gate driver is a specialized circuit that is used to drive the gate (gate driver) of power MOSFETs effectively and efficiently in high-speed switching applications. The addition of high-speed MOSFET gate drivers are the last step if the turn-on is intended to fully enhance the conducting channel of the MOSFET technology.

== MOSFET technology ==
The gate driver works under the same principle as the MOSFET transistor. It provides an output current that provides a charge to the semiconductor by a control electrode. It is also simple to drive and has resistive nature for power uses.
