= Scientific Research Group In Egypt =

Scientific Research Group in Egypt (SRGE) is a group of young Egyptian researchers established under the chairman of the group founder Prof. Aboul Ella Hassanien (Professor of Information Technology at the Faculty of Computer and Information, Cairo University). The main target of the group is establishing a research community for sharing common interests. Therefore the research map of the group consists of multidisciplinary research interests including: Networks, Intelligent Environment, bio-informatics, chemoinformatics, and information security.

== SRGE Objectives ==
- Encourage young academic researchers to collaborate within a well-established research community.
- Applying new computational designing and solutions for a number of new emerged challenges, especially those related to the Egyptian society.
- Establishing connections and joint research activities with other international research groups.
- Helping PhD/Master group’s members to produce high-quality academic research, and guiding them to publish their work in a prestigious and well-known journals.

== SRGE Research Directions ==
=== Bioinformatics and Biomedical Engineering ===
The Bioinformatics team focus on the clinical results to design a computer-based decision support systems. The team is responsible for designing methods for sampling, analyzing, and investigating collected data. The current research area includes: Medical image processing, Breast cancer, Liver fibrosis and tumor detection, within sonar, MRI, fMRI, and CT images.

=== Intelligent Environment and Applications ===
The Intelligent environment (IE) refers to the application of ubiquitous and wireless devices to solve some of the environmental-related challenges; such as monitoring water/air pollution levels, smart home applications. Moreover, IE allowing smart devices to automatically react to the people reactions such as voice, gestures, or movements, therefore they are suitable for disabled people.

=== Network and Information Security (NIS) ===
Information security is one of the challenging issue for any ICT emerging technology. The NIC team is responsible for detecting the security challenges and provide suitable solutions. A number of current researches have been conducted such as image authentications through watermarking and biometrics approaches, and secure communication and cryptography.

=== Social networks and Graph Mining ===
The social networks along with the increase importance of the graph as an important modeling tool to define complex structure, had encouraged the SRGE board member to establish this research direction. Currently a number of PhD and MSc. students carried out a number of project to analysis some large amount of structured data through the application of data and graph mining approaches.

=== Animal Identification ===
The new advances in wireless communication raise the ability to use the human biometric identification approaches for animal identification domain and overcome some of the traditional identification methodologies. The animal biometrics include: muzzle prints, iris patterns, and vascular patterns detections. The responsible team will design and enhance the current application of computational-based animal detection methodologies.
