= Smart pill =

Smart pill may refer to:

- Capsule endoscopy, use of a pill containing a small camera used to record internal images of the gastrointestinal tract for use in medical diagnosis
- Digital pill, a pill which contains a drug and an ingestible sensor that transmits medical data
- Colloquial term for purported nootropic agents
- Smart pill (relay), a relay which can be added to an electrical circuit to turn on or off one or more appliances, for example via an app, smart switch and/or a conventional push switch
