= Display driver =

NXP PCF8577C LCD driver with I²C communication

In electronics/computer hardware, a display driver is usually a semiconductor integrated circuit (but may alternatively comprise a state machine made of discrete logic and other components) which provides an interface function between a microprocessor, microcontroller, ASIC or general-purpose peripheral interface and a particular type of display device, e.g. LCD, LED, OLED, ePaper, CRT, Vacuum fluorescent or Nixie.

The display driver will typically accept commands and data using an industry-standard general-purpose serial or parallel interface, such as TTL, CMOS, RS-232, SPI, I^{2}C, etc. and generate signals with suitable voltage, current, timing and demultiplexing to make the display show the desired text or image.

The display driver may itself be an application-specific microcontroller and may incorporate RAM, Flash memory, EEPROM or ROM. Fixed ROM may contain firmware and display fonts.

A notable example of a display driver IC is the Hitachi HD44780 LCD controller. Other controllers are KS0108, SSD1815 (graphics capable) and ST7920 (graphics capable)

== History ==
The use of integrated circuit technology to drive a display driver chip dates back to the late 1960s. In 1969, Hewlett-Packard introduced the HP Model 5082-7000 Numeric Indicator, an early LED display and the first LED device to use integrated circuit technology. Its development was led by Howard C. Borden and Gerald P. Pighini at HP Associates and HP Labs, who had engaged in research and development (R&D) on practical LEDs between 1962 and 1968. It was the first intelligent LED display, making it a revolution in digital display technology, replacing the Nixie tube and becoming the basis for later LED displays.

In the early 21st century, display driver chips are widely used for mobile displays in smartphones and other smart devices as well as larger flat-panel displays. Between 2003 and 2005, LCD driver chips sold 9,821.2 million units worldwide.

== See also ==
- Device driver
- Printer driver
