= LDMOS =

Double-diffused MOSFET

LDMOS (laterally-diffused metal-oxide semiconductor) is a planar double-diffused MOSFET (metal–oxide–semiconductor field-effect transistor) used in amplifiers, including microwave power amplifiers, RF power amplifiers and audio power amplifiers. These transistors are often fabricated on p/p^{+} silicon epitaxial layers. The fabrication of LDMOS devices mostly involves various ion-implantation and subsequent annealing cycles. As an example, the drift region of this power MOSFET is fabricated using up to three ion implantation sequences in order to achieve the appropriate doping profile needed to withstand high electric fields.

The silicon-based RF LDMOS (radio-frequency LDMOS) is the most widely used RF power amplifier in mobile networks, enabling the majority of the world's cellular voice and data traffic. LDMOS devices are widely used in RF power amplifiers for base-stations as the requirement is for high output power with a corresponding drain to source breakdown voltage usually above 60 volts. Compared to other devices such as GaAs FETs they show a lower maximum power gain frequency.

Manufacturers of LDMOS devices and foundries offering LDMOS technologies include, Diodes Inc, Tower Semiconductor, TSMC, LFoundry, SAMSUNG, GLOBALFOUNDRIES, Vanguard International Semiconductor Corporation, STMicroelectronics, Infineon Technologies, RFMD, NXP Semiconductors (including former Freescale Semiconductor), SMIC, MK Semiconductors, Polyfet and Ampleon.

== Photo gallery ==
Various RF LDMOS transistors
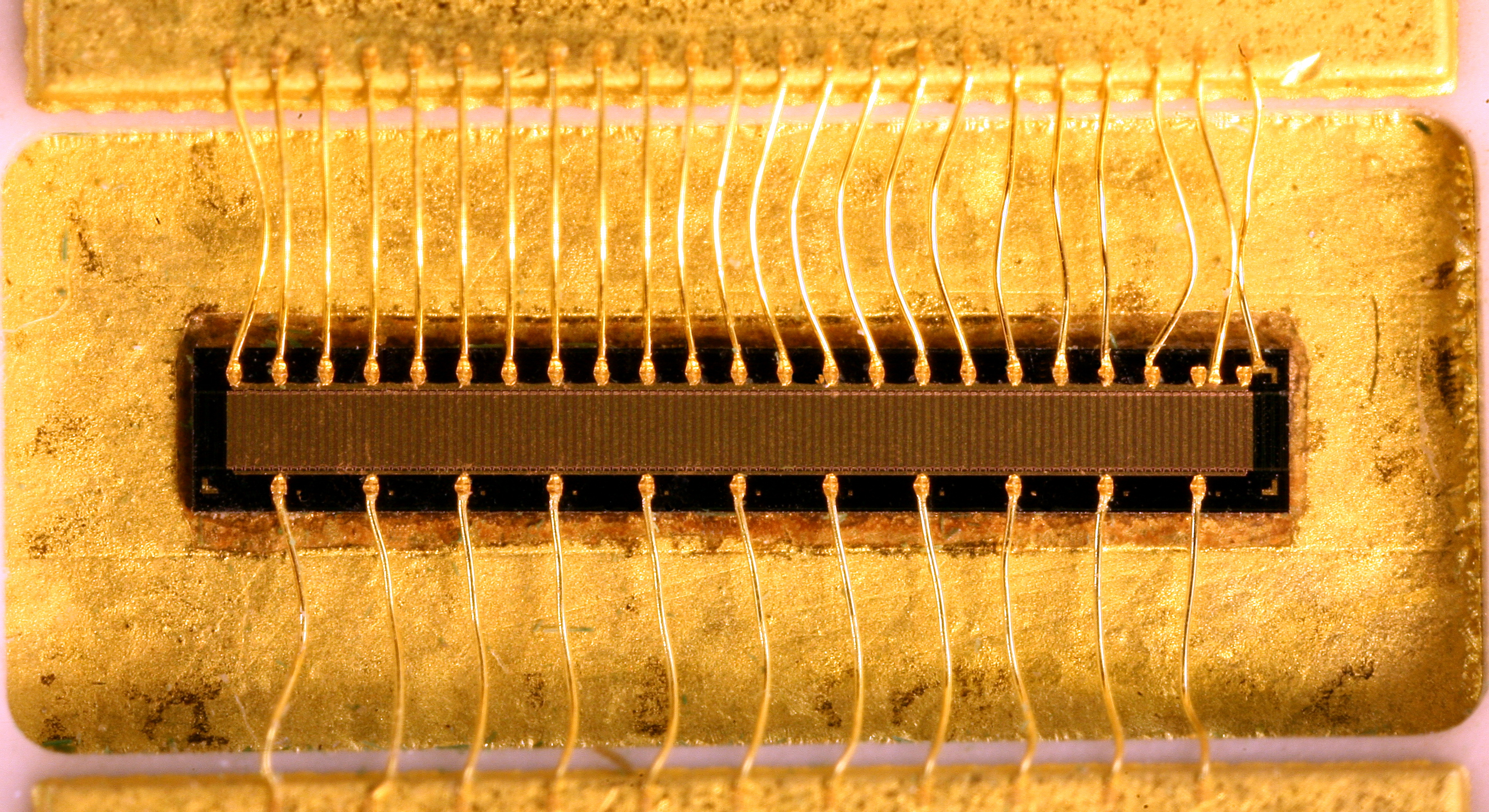
BLF2045 silicon die. RF LDMOS 26 V 180 mA 2 GHz 10 dB 30 W SOT467C. Designed for broadband operation (1800 to 2200 MHz).

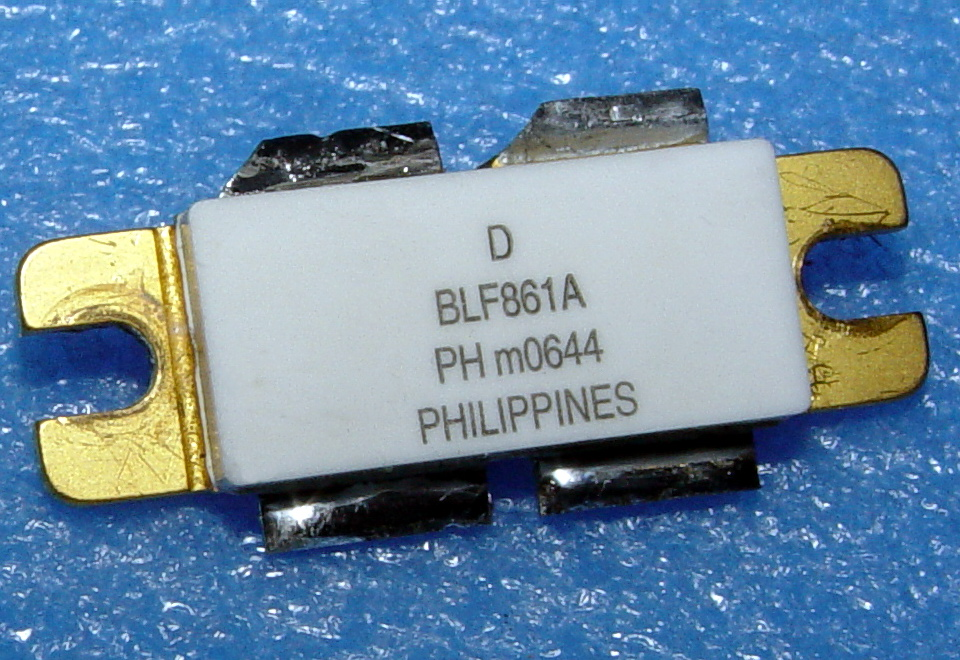
BLF861A RF LDMOS transistor. RF LDMOS transistor 860 MHz 150 W.

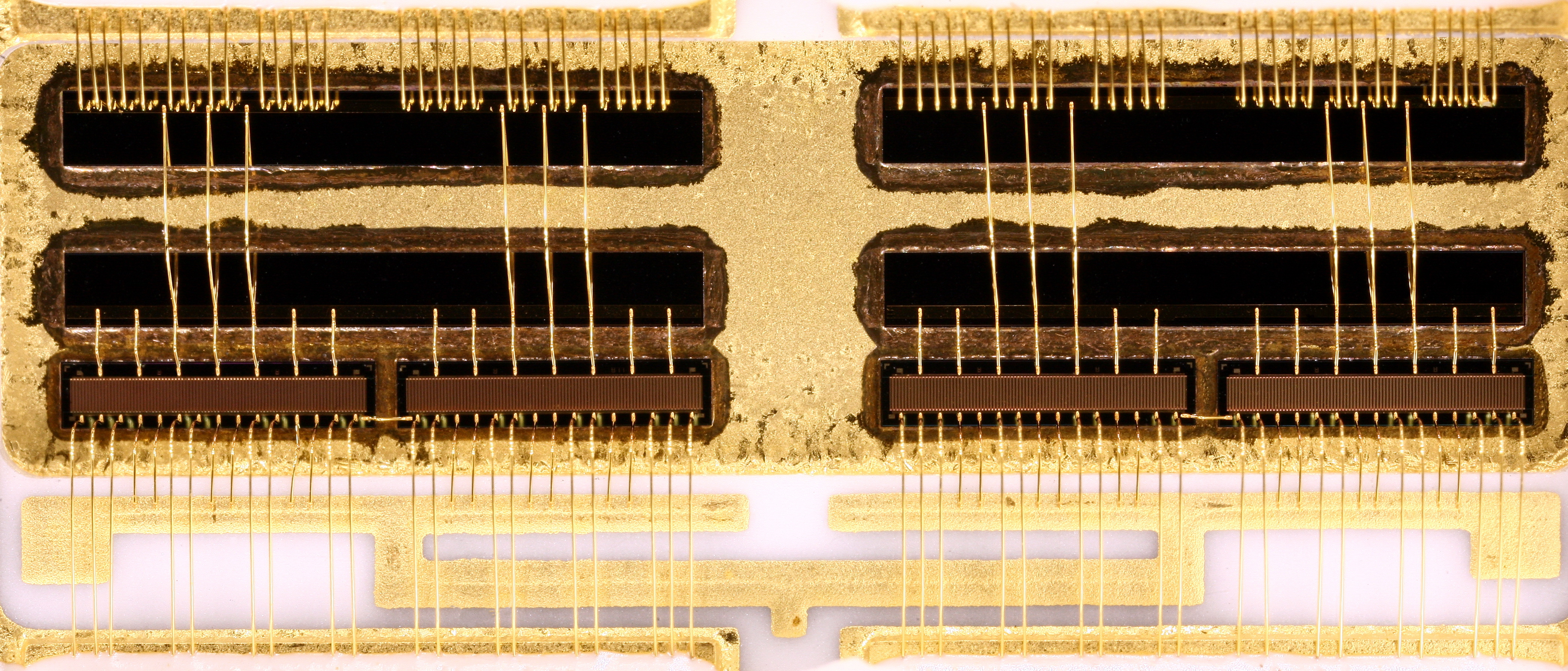
BLF861A silicon die. RF LDMOS transistor 860 MHz 150 W. Designed for UHF operation.

== Applications ==
Common applications of LDMOS technology include the following.

- Amplifiers — RF power amplifiers, audio power amplifiers, class AB
- Audio technology — loudspeakers, high-fidelity (hi-fi) equipment, public announcement (PA) systems
- Mobile devices — mobile phones
  - Mobile networks — base stations and RF amplifiers
- Pulse applications
- Radio-frequency (RF) technology — RF engineering (RF engineering), RF power amplifiers
- Wireless technology — wireless networks and digital networks

=== RF LDMOS ===
Common applications of RF LDMOS technology include the following.

- Aerospace and defense technology — military applications
  - Automatic Dependent Surveillance–Broadcast (ADS–B)
  - Electronic warfare — communications information warfare, multi-band communication systems
  - Military technology — military communications
- Alarm and security — security alarm
- Avionics — ADS-B transponders, identification friend or foe (IFF) transponders, secondary surveillance radar (SSR), distance measuring equipment (DME), Mode S edge-localized mode (ELM), tactical data link (TDL), airband
- Consumer electronics
- Data logging
- Equipment condition monitoring (CM)
- Fire detection
- Gas detection — carbon monoxide detector (CO detector), methane detection
- Industrial, Scientific and Medical band (ISM band) applications — particle accelerators, welding, continuous wave (CW) applications, linear applications, pulse applications
  - Industrial technology
  - Medical technology — magnetic resonance imaging (MRI)
- Laser technology — laser drivers, carbon dioxide laser (CO_{2} laser)
- Radio technology — commercial radio, public safety radio, marine radio, amateur radio, portable radio, wideband, narrowband
  - Millimeter-wave (mmW) technology
  - Mobile radio — professional mobile radio, handheld transistor radio, analog radio, digital radio, digital mobile radio (DMR), land mobile radio system (LMRS), private mobile radio (PMR), Terrestrial Trunked Radio (TETRA)
  - Radar technology — L band, S band
  - Radio-frequency (RF) technology — radio-frequency identification (RFID) RF plasma generator
- RF energy technology — lighting, medical technology, drying, automotive electronics
  - Heating — electric heating, RF heating, microwave heating
  - Kitchen appliances — smart appliances, countertop appliances, cooking appliances, RF cooking, microwave cooking, RF defrosting, frozen food defrosting, freezers, refrigerators, ovens
  - Smart lighting — RF lighting and wireless light switch
- Telecommunications
  - Broadband — mobile broadband
  - Broadcasting — ultra high frequency (UHF) broadcasting, FM broadcasting
  - Cellular networks — 2G, 3G, International Mobile Telecommunications-2000 (IMT), Long-Term Evolution (LTE), 4G, 5G, 5G New Radio (5G NR)
  - High frequency (HF) communication — very high frequency (VHF), ultra high frequency (UHF)
  - Cellular voice and data traffic
  - Television (TV) — VHF TV, UHF TV, digital TV (DTV), TV transmitter equipment
  - Wideband and mobile communications — base stations, emergency position-indicating radiobeacon station (EPIRB), sonar buoys, automatic meter reading (AMR)
  - Wireless technology — mobile communication, satellite communication, wireless data modems, WiMAX
- Voltage standing wave ratio (VSWR) applications — plasma etching and synchrotrons

== See also ==
- FET amplifier
- Power semiconductor device
- RF CMOS
