= FET amplifier =

Device using a field effect transistor

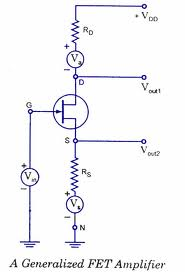
Generalised FET as an amplifier

An FET amplifier is an amplifier that uses one or more field-effect transistors (FETs). The most common type of FET amplifier is the MOSFET amplifier, which uses metal–oxide–semiconductor FETs (MOSFETs). The main advantage of a FET used for amplification is that it has very high input impedance and low output impedance.

== In detail ==
The transconductance is given by

$$g_m = {I_\mathrm{D} \over V_\mathrm{GS}}$$

On rearranging, we get

$$I_\mathrm{D} = g_m V_\mathrm{GS}$$

== Equivalent circuit ==
The internal resistance R_{gs}, between gate and source appears between drain and source. R_{ds} is the internal resistance between the drain and source. As R_{gs} is very high, it is taken to be infinite, and R_{ds} is neglected.

== Voltage gain ==
For ideal FET equivalent circuit, voltage gain is given by,

$$A_v = \frac{V_{DS}}{V_{GS}}$$

From the equivalent circuit,

$$V_{DS} = I_D \cdot R_D$$

and from the definition of transconductance,

$$V_{GS} = \frac{I_D}{g_m}$$

we get

$$A_V = g_m \cdot R_D$$

== Types of FET amplifiers ==
There are three types of FET amplifiers, depending on which terminal is the common input and output. (This is similar to a bipolar junction transistor (BJT) amplifier.)

=== Common gate amplifier ===
The gate is common to both input and output.

=== Common source amplifier ===
The source is common to both input and output.

=== Common drain amplifier ===
The drain is common to both input and output. It is also known as a "source follower".

== History ==
The basic principle of the field-effect transistor (FET) amplifier was first proposed by Austro-Hungarian physicist Julius Edgar Lilienfeld in 1925. However, his early FET concept was not a practical design. The FET concept was later also theorized by Oskar Heil in the 1930s and William Shockley in the 1940s, but there was no working practical FET built at the time.

=== MOSFET amplifier ===
A breakthrough came with the work of Egyptian engineer Mohamed M. Atalla in the late 1950s. He developed the method of surface passivation, which later became critical to the semiconductor industry as it made possible the mass-production of silicon semiconductor technology, such as integrated circuit (IC) chips. For the surface passivation process, he developed the method of thermal oxidation, which was a breakthrough in silicon semiconductor technology. The surface passivation method was presented by Atalla in 1957. Building on the surface passivation method, Atalla developed the metal–oxide–semiconductor (MOS) process, with the use of thermally oxidized silicon. He proposed that the MOS process could be used to build the first working silicon FET, which he began working on building with the help of Korean recruit Dawon Kahng.

The MOS field-effect transistor (MOSFET) amplifier was invented by Mohamed Atalla and Dawon Kahng in 1959. They fabricated the device in November 1959, and presented it as the "silicon–silicon dioxide field induced surface device" in early 1960, at the Solid-State Device Conference held at Carnegie Mellon University. The device is covered by two now long-expired patents, each filed separately by Atalla and Kahng in March 1960.

== See also ==
- Audio power amplifier
- LDMOS
- Power electronics
- Power semiconductor device
- Power MOSFET
- RF power amplifier
