= Smart plug =

Power plug/socket smart device

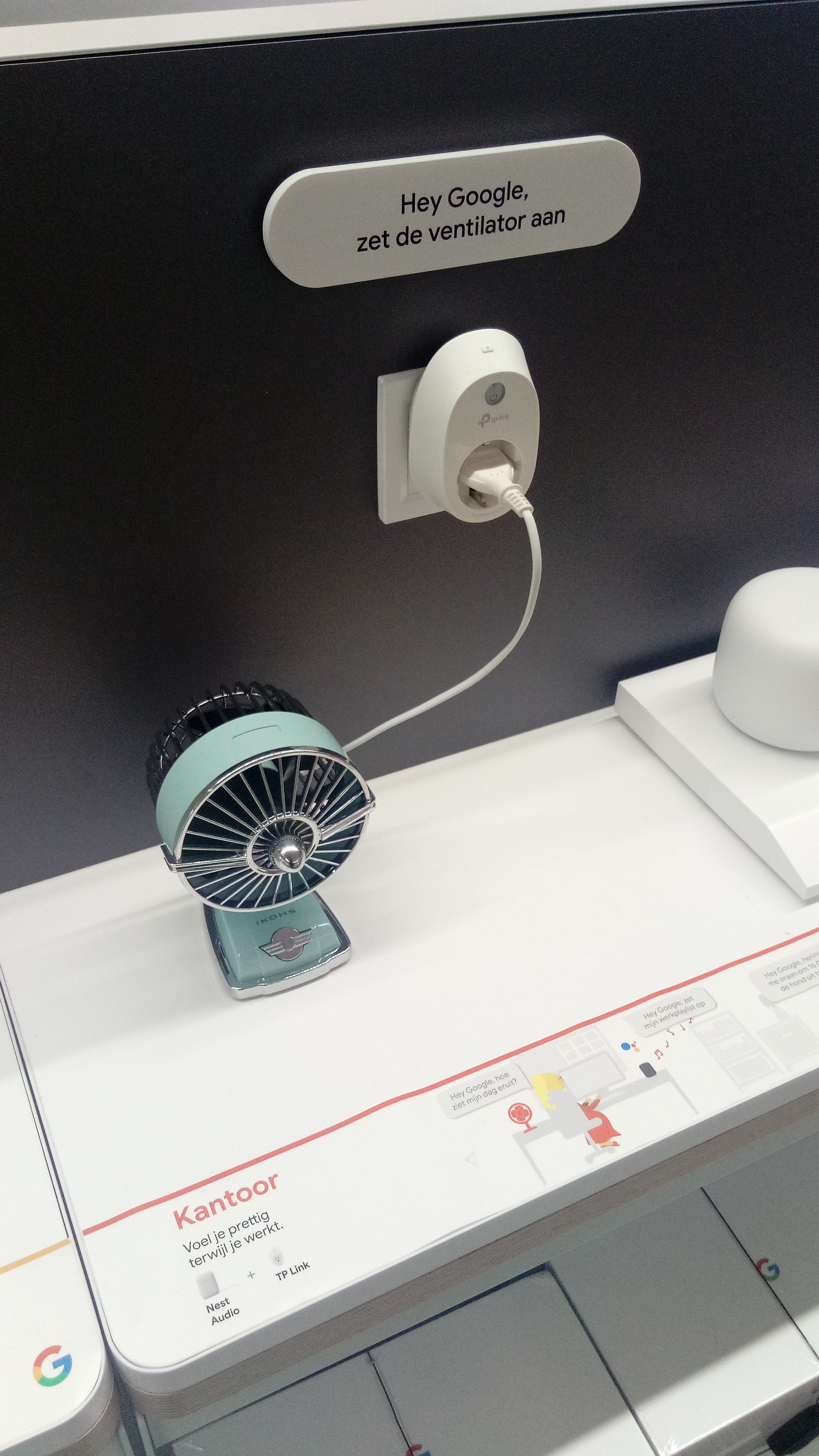
Display in Rotterdam showing how to use Google Assistant with a smart plug to turn on an electric fan (Dutch: zet de ventilator aan)

Smart plugs were first deployed in the early 2010s as a solution for users, helping reduce wasted energy from unused or forgotten devices. This phenomenon is known as phantom energy, referring to the electricity devices draw even when powered off, increasing overall power consumption. Nearly 5-10 percent of household electricity is wasted on devices placed on standby mode.

Smart plugs do not have a single inventor, as the concept was first introduced by several individuals, and then manufactured by companies later on. This is similar to the light bulb, which is commonly attributed to Edison, although prominent corporations have commercialized and refined the original idea in their own way. A few early pioneers of the smart plug include John La Grou, Steve Purdham, and Sanjib Kumar.

A smart plug is a power plug (also known as a wall plug, outlet, or electrical connector) which can be fitted between power cords and sockets to function as a remote-controlled power switch. As such, smart plugs can be used to make "dumb" electrical equipment smart, and thereby enable such devices for home automation or building automation purposes.

Smart plugs can, for example, be controlled via a mobile application, a smart home hub or a virtual assistant. Examples of protocols used for communication with smart plugs include Wi-Fi, Bluetooth, Zigbee and Z-Wave. Many smart plugs have a built-in ammeter so that energy consumption (measured in kilowatt-hours) of the connected equipment can be monitored. Smart plugs often have a slim profile so as not to hinder access to neighbouring sockets in a wall outlet or power strip.

Smart plugs offer several practical advantages that enhance energy efficiency and convenience. They allow users to control appliances remotely through smartphones or smart assistants, which can be particularly useful for switching off high-energy devices like water heaters, air conditioners, or lights when away from home. Many smart plugs also support scheduling and home automation routines — for example, turning on a geyser 30 minutes before a person arrives home or automatically switching off after a fixed period to conserve power. In addition to energy savings, some smart plugs contribute to safety by reducing the risk of electrical fires from unattended appliances.

As an IoT device, a smart plug has the capabilities of a small computer that connects to a larger network. This network is then shared with users who can remotely control devices through the use of an app on their phone or alternative device. Therefore, the IoT device itself is more beneficial for individuals seeking a set schedule for their daily routines or cost-efficient homeowners who are looking to save money. Small steps, such as introducing a smart plug, can play an important role in smart home adoption. By experiencing the benefits of the plug firsthand, users will be more inclined to slowly begin switching out additional components of their home, such as larger appliances.

== See also ==
- Wireless light switch
- Time switch
