= Gate driver =

Power amplifier

A gate driver is a power amplifier that accepts a low-power input from a controller IC and produces a high-current drive input for the gate of a high-power transistor such as an IGBT or power MOSFET. Gate drivers can be provided either on-chip or as a discrete module. In essence, a gate driver consists of a level shifter in combination with an amplifier. A gate driver IC serves as the interface between control signals (digital or analog controllers) and power switches (IGBTs, MOSFETs, SiC MOSFETs, and GaN HEMTs). An integrated gate-driver solution reduces design complexity, development time, bill of materials (BOM), and board space while improving reliability over discretely-implemented gate-drive solutions.

== History ==
In 1989, International Rectifier (IR) introduced the first monolithic HVIC gate driver product, the high-voltage integrated circuit (HVIC) technology uses patented and proprietary monolithic structures integrating bipolar, CMOS, and lateral DMOS devices with breakdown voltages above 700 V and 1400 V for operating offset voltages of 600 V and 1200 V.

Using this mixed-signal HVIC technology, both high-voltage level-shifting circuits and low-voltage analog and digital circuits can be implemented. With the ability to place high-voltage circuitry (in a ‘well’ formed by polysilicon rings), that can ‘float’ 600 V or 1200 V, on the same silicon away from the rest of the low-voltage circuitry, high-side power MOSFETs or IGBTs exist in many popular off-line circuit topologies such as buck, synchronous boost, half-bridge, full-bridge and three-phase. The HVIC gate drivers with floating switches are well-suited for topologies requiring high-side, half-bridge, and three-phase configurations.

== Purpose ==
In contrast to bipolar transistors, MOSFETs do not require continuous base current to remain in the on-state, as long as they are not being switched on or off. The isolated gate-electrode of the MOSFET forms a capacitor (gate capacitor), which must be charged or discharged each time the MOSFET is switched on or off. As a transistor requires a particular gate voltage in order to switch on, the gate capacitor must be charged to at least the required gate voltage for the transistor to be switched on.The total gate charge $Q_g$, rather than simple capacitance, determines the required drive energy:

$E_{gate} = Q_g \times V_{GS}$

The average gate-drive power required is:

$P_{gate} = Q_g \times V_{GS} \times f_s$

where $f_s$ is the switching frequency.

Similarly, to switch the transistor off, this charge must be dissipated, i.e. the gate capacitor must be discharged.

When a transistor is switched on or off, it does not immediately switch from a non-conducting to a conducting state; and may transiently support both a high voltage and conduct a high current. Consequently, when gate current is applied to a transistor to cause it to switch, a certain amount of heat is generated which can, in some cases, be enough to destroy the transistor. Therefore, it is necessary to keep the switching time as short as possible, so as to minimize switching loss. Typical switching times are in the range of microseconds. The switching time of a transistor is inversely proportional to the amount of current used to charge the gate. Therefore, switching currents are often required in the range of several hundred milliamperes, or even in the range of amperes. For typical gate voltages of approximately 10-15V, several watts of power may be required to drive the switch. When large currents are switched at high frequencies, e.g. in DC-to-DC converters or large electric motors, multiple transistors are sometimes provided in parallel, so as to provide sufficiently high switching currents and switching power.

The switching signal for a transistor is usually generated by a logic circuit or a microcontroller, which provides an output signal that typically is limited to a few milliamperes of current. Consequently, a transistor which is directly driven by such a signal would switch very slowly, with correspondingly high power loss. During switching, the gate capacitor of the transistor may draw current so quickly that it causes a current overdraw in the logic circuit or microcontroller, causing overheating which leads to permanent damage or even complete destruction of the chip. To prevent this from happening, a gate driver is provided between the microcontroller output signal and the power transistor.

Charge pumps are often used in H-bridges in high side drivers for gate driving the high side n-channel power MOSFETs and IGBTs. These devices are used because of their good performance, but require a gate drive voltage a few volts above the power rail. When the centre of a half bridge goes low the capacitor is charged via a diode, and this charge is used to later drive the gate of the high side FET gate a few volts above the source or emitter pin's voltage so as to switch it on. This strategy works well provided the bridge is regularly switched and avoids the complexity of having to run a separate power supply and permits the more efficient n-channel devices to be used for both high and low switches.

== Switching losses ==
During switching transitions, a power semiconductor device simultaneously sustains substantial voltage and current. This overlap results in switching losses, which can be approximated as:

$P_{sw} \approx \frac{1}{2} V I (t_r + t_f) f_s$

where $t_r$ is the rise time, $t_f$ is the fall time, and $f_s$ is the switching frequency.

To reduce switching losses, the transition intervals must be made as short as practical. Because switching time is inversely related to the available gate drive current, peak gate currents ranging from several hundred milliamperes to several amperes are commonly required in power electronic applications. Modern gate driver integrated circuits typically provide peak source and sink currents in the range of 1–10 A.

At typical gate voltages of 10–15 V and high switching frequencies, such as those used in DC-to-DC converters and motor drives, the gate-drive circuitry may dissipate several watts of power, particularly when multiple devices are connected in parallel.

== Need for a gate driver ==
Logic circuits and microcontrollers typically provide output currents of only a few milliamperes. Directly driving the gate of a power MOSFET or IGBT from such outputs would result in slow switching transitions and increased switching losses. In addition, the high transient current required to charge and discharge the gate capacitance may exceed the current capability of the control device.

A gate driver provides current amplification and electrical buffering between the control circuitry and the power device. This allows rapid charging and discharging of the gate capacitance, reduces switching losses, and improves overall system reliability.

== High-side driving and bootstrap operation ==
In half-bridge and full-bridge converter topologies, N-channel MOSFETs or IGBTs are commonly used on both the low and high sides because of their lower conduction losses compared to P-channel devices. However, driving a high-side N-channel device requires a gate voltage several volts higher than its source potential.

A widely used technique for high-side gate driving is the bootstrap method. When the low-side device conducts and the switching node is near ground potential, a bootstrap capacitor is charged through a diode from a low-voltage supply. When the high-side device is turned on, the stored charge raises the gate voltage above the source potential, enabling conduction.

The bootstrap technique eliminates the need for a separate isolated power supply for the high-side driver and simplifies circuit implementation. However, it requires periodic switching to refresh the bootstrap capacitor and is generally unsuitable for continuous 100% duty-cycle operation without additional circuitry.

== Additional considerations ==
Modern gate driver integrated circuits often incorporate additional protection and control features, including galvanic isolation, Miller clamp circuitry to prevent false turn-on caused by high $dv/dt$, soft turn-off protection, desaturation detection for IGBT protection, negative gate bias capability, and separate source and sink outputs for independent control of switching transitions.

Wide-bandgap semiconductor devices such as silicon carbide (SiC) MOSFETs and gallium nitride (GaN) HEMTs require specialized gate driver designs due to their high switching speeds, higher $dv/dt$ (which may exceed 100 V/ns), lower gate threshold voltages, and tighter gate voltage tolerances.
