= Wireless light switch =

Light switch

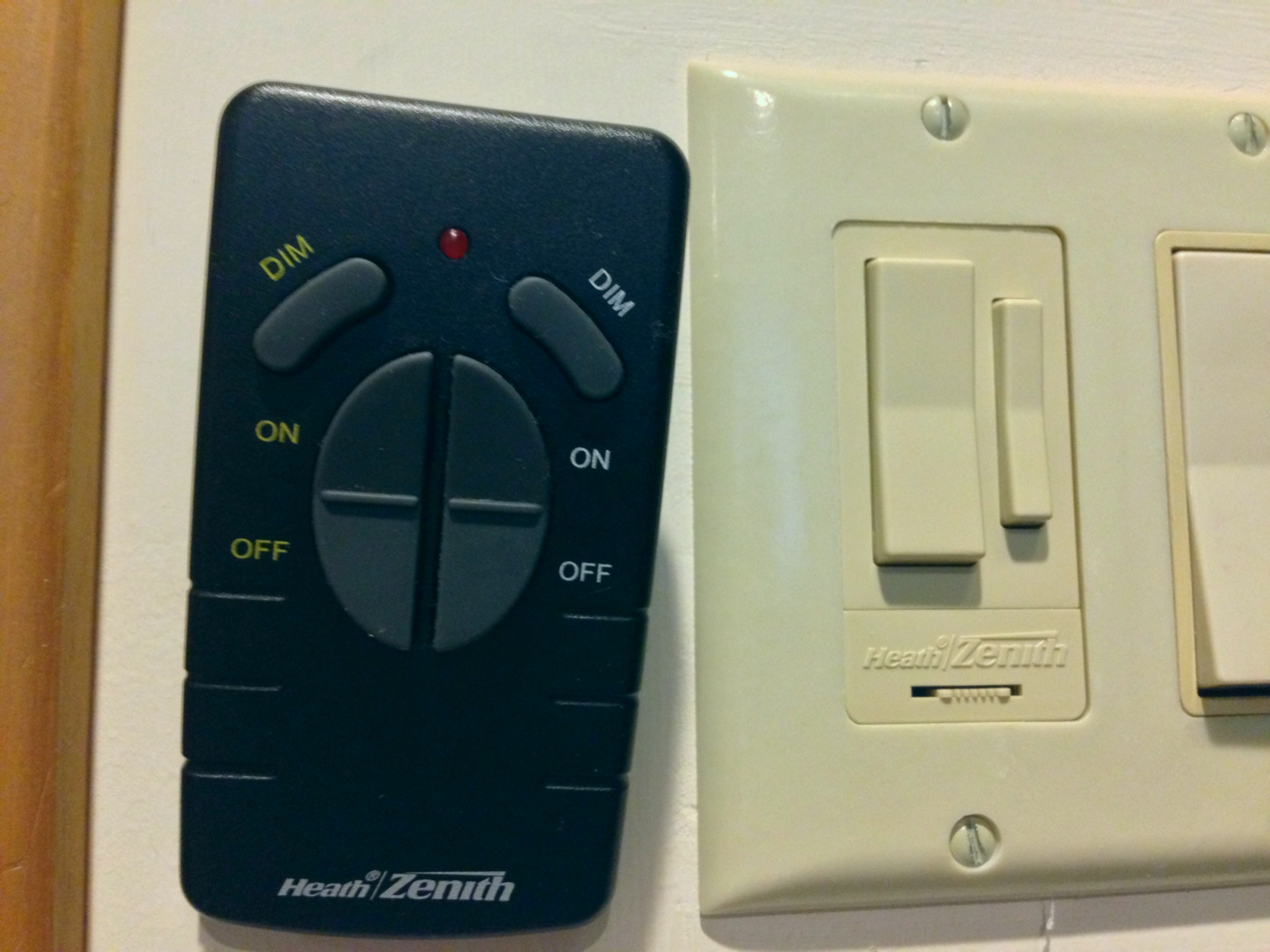
Dimmer light switch with RF-based remote control

A wireless light switch is a light switch that commands a light or home appliance to turn itself off or on, instead of interrupting the power line going to the light fixture. There are different ways to communicate between the switch and the fixture:

1. Using radio transmission: A radio receiver is typically wired or screwed into a fixture or device, wired or otherwise connected to the electrical system of the building or plugged into an outlet. The radio receiver's memory is programmed by any number of means to respond to certain selected "switches" or (more correctly) remote control transmitters.
2. Using the existing power lines (such as INSTEON or X10): A receiver is plugged into an outlet and a device is then plugged into the receiver. The plug-in receiver is then programmed to the switches. Some devices are hard wired into ceiling light fittings, making for a hidden system.

== Common uses for wireless switches ==
=== Complicated wiring ===
Multiple wireless transmitters can command a single receiver. This means switches in different locations can turn the same electrical load on or off. Switching like this is often used in stairwells or rooms where two or more switches are used to turn one light on or off. Achieving this result with wired three-way or four-way switches requires a higher level of electrical knowledge and more time for wiring and installation.

=== Remodelling ===
Wireless light switches eliminate the wire from the light to the switch location. This is useful in remodelling situations where new wiring can be a hassle. Rather than tearing down a wall to gain access to the wires, a wireless switch can be used. This avoids any need to access wires and makes remodelling fast and simple.

=== Log homes ===
Another use for wireless switches is in log homes, where electrical installations can be difficult because of the amount of routing and drilling that would otherwise be needed. When running a regular (non-wireless) circuit, the electrician must drill a hole through all of the logs to get each wire to the switch location. The electrician also must cut a large hole in the log to install a switch box. Wireless switches do not need switch boxes because there are no wires and no routing is needed. This decreases the electrical work required.

=== Brick, concrete, tile and plaster walls ===
Installing a wired switch in a solid brick or concrete wall or installing on a plaster or tiled wall requires delicate routing and drilling to create a channel in the wall for the wire and space for the switch and switch box inside the wall. This routing and drilling work could damage the surface, causing expensive repair work. Wireless switches do not need any channels, holes, boxes or wire in the wall. This reduces the amount of electrical work required when installing a switch.

== Battery-free switches ==
All remote light switches require a power source in order to facilitate the transmission of a signal to the receiving device. Some of these switches rely on batteries for power output while most are required to be wired into an existing electrical system. Lightning Switch, EnOcean, CHERRY and others manufacture wireless light switches that use energy harvesting instead of batteries. The mechanical energy created by pressing the switch generates enough electricity to power a built-in transmitter that sends a radio signal to the receiver.

== Smart switches ==
Some light switches can be controlled by smartphone app that can usually directly control the light but for simple switches must be fitted to a smart home hub. To be addressed directly, the wireless light switch and lamp need to share the same protocol, e.g. a Bluetooth mesh Lighting model or Zigbee LightLink. Apple also provide HomeKit that integrates these user interfaces.

A "smart pill" is a relay which can be added to an electrical circuit to turn on or off one or more appliances, like lights or solar screens. Smart pills can for example be controlled via an app, a wireless switch and/or a conventional push switch.

== See also ==
- Smart plug
