= Smart device =

Type of electronic device

Smartphones, one of the most popular smart devices

A smart device is an electronic device, generally connected to other devices or networks via different Wireless protocols (such as Bluetooth, Zigbee, near-field communication, Wi-Fi, NearLink, Li-Fi, or 5G) that can operate to some extent interactively and autonomously. Several notable types of smart devices are smartphones, smart speakers, smart cars, smart cards, smart thermostats, smart doorbells, smart locks, smart refrigerators, phablets and tablets, smartwatches, smart bands, smart keychains, smart glasses, smart TV, and many others. The term can also refer to a device that exhibits some properties of ubiquitous computing, including—although not necessarily—machine learning.

Smart devices can be designed to support a variety of form factors, a range of properties pertaining to ubiquitous computing and to be used in three main system environments: physical world, human-centered environments, and distributed computing environments. Smart homes indicate the presence of sensors and some detection devices, appliances, and a database to control them.

== Form factors ==
In 1991, Mark Weiser proposed three basic forms for ubiquitous system devices: tabs, pads and boards.

- Tabs: accompanied or wearable centimetre sized devices, e.g., smartphones, smart cards
- Pads: hand-held decimetre-sized devices, e.g., laptops
- Boards: meter sized interactive display devices, e.g., horizontal surface computers and vertical SMART boards.

These three forms proposed by Weiser are characterized by being macro-sized, having a planar form and by incorporating visual output displays. These were also envisioned more as information appliances. If each of these three characteristics is relaxed, this range can be expanded into a much more diverse and potentially more useful range of ubiquitous computing devices.

== Characteristics ==
Smart devices are typically composed of a hardware layer (including a radio that transmits signals), a network layer (through which devices communicate with each other), and an application layer (through which end users deliver commands). These layers often include the following characteristics:

- A set of system hardware & software IT resources. This set is usually static, fixed at design time.
- Dynamic component-oriented resource extensions & plug-ins (plug and play) of some hardware resources.
- Remote external service access and execution.
- Local, internal autonomous service execution.
- Access to specific external environments: human interaction, physical world interaction and distributed ICT / virtual computing interaction.
- Some ubiquitous computing properties.

Common types of smart devices include:

- Tab and pad type smart devices that often act as personalized smart mobile devices
- Smart environment devices.

== Ubiquitous computing properties ==
Weiser's vision for ubiquitous computing can be summarized in terms of two core properties:

- Devices need to be networked, distributed and transparently accessible.
- Human–computer interaction with devices is hidden to a degree from its users.

It is proposed that there are two additional core types of properties for ubiquitous computing systems:

- Devices can operate to some extent autonomously, i.e., without human intervention, be self-governed.
- Devices can handle a multiplicity of dynamic actions and interactions, governed by intelligent decision-making and organisational interaction. This may entail some form of artificial intelligence in order to:
  - handle incomplete and non-deterministic interactions
  - cooperation and competition between members of organizations
  - richer interaction through sharing of context, semantics and goals, etc.

However, it is hard to fix a closed set of properties that define all ubiquitous computing devices because of the sheer range and variety of ubiquitous computing research and applications. Rather than to propose a single definition for ubiquitous computing, a taxonomy of properties for ubiquitous computing has been proposed, from which different kinds or flavours of ubiquitous systems and applications can be composed and described.

== Environments ==
The term smart device environments has two meanings. First, it can refer to a greater variety of device environments. Three different kinds of environments for devices can be differentiated:

- Virtual computing environments that enable smart devices to access pertinent services anywhere and anytime.
- Physical environments that may be embedded with a variety of smart devices of different types including tags, sensors and controllers. These can have different form factors ranging from nano to micro to macro sized.
- Humans environments: humans, either individually or collectively, inherently form a smart environment for devices. However, humans may themselves be accompanied by smart devices such as mobile phones, use surface-mounted devices (wearable computing) and contain embedded devices (e.g., pacemakers to maintain a healthy heart operation).

Second, the term smart device environments can also refer to the concept of a smart environment which focuses more specifically on the physical environment of the device. The physical environment is smart because it is embedded or scattered with smart devices that can sense and control part of it.
