= Solid-state relay =

Electronic switching device

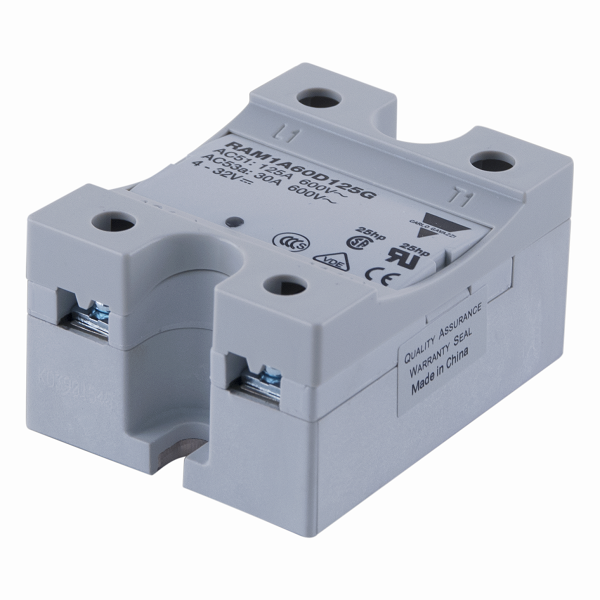
- Component type: Electronic switching device
- Working principle: semiconductivity
- Inventor: International Rectifier
- Invention year: 1971
- Pin names: Control IN, Control OUT, Load IN, Load OUT

Electronic symbol

A solid-state relay (SSR) is an electronic switching device that switches on or off when an external voltage (AC or DC) is applied across its control terminals. They serve the same function as an electromechanical relay, but solid-state electronics contain no moving parts and have a longer operational lifetime. Solid state relays were invented in 1971 by the Crydom Controls division of International Rectifier.

SSRs consist of a sensor which responds to an appropriate input (control signal), an electronic switching device which switches power to the load circuitry, and a coupling mechanism to enable the control signal to activate this switch without mechanical parts. They may be designed to switch either AC or DC loads. Packaged SSRs use power semiconductor devices such as thyristors and transistors, to switch currents up to around a hundred amperes. SSRs have fast switching speeds compared with electromechanical relays, and have no physical contacts to wear out. SSRs are unable to withstand a large momentary overload the way an electromechanical relay can, and have a higher "on" resistance.

Modern SSRs increasingly integrate built-in diagnostics and protection features, such as overtemperature shutoff, load monitoring, and short-circuit detection. These embedded protections help extend relay lifespan and prevent damage to connected loads or upstream circuitry, especially in industrial automation settings.

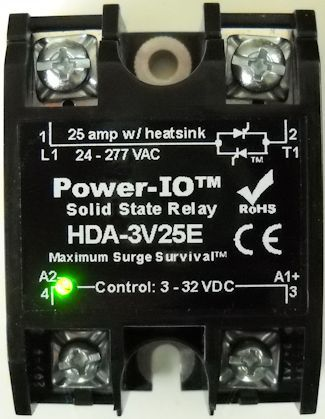
Solid state relay with green LED

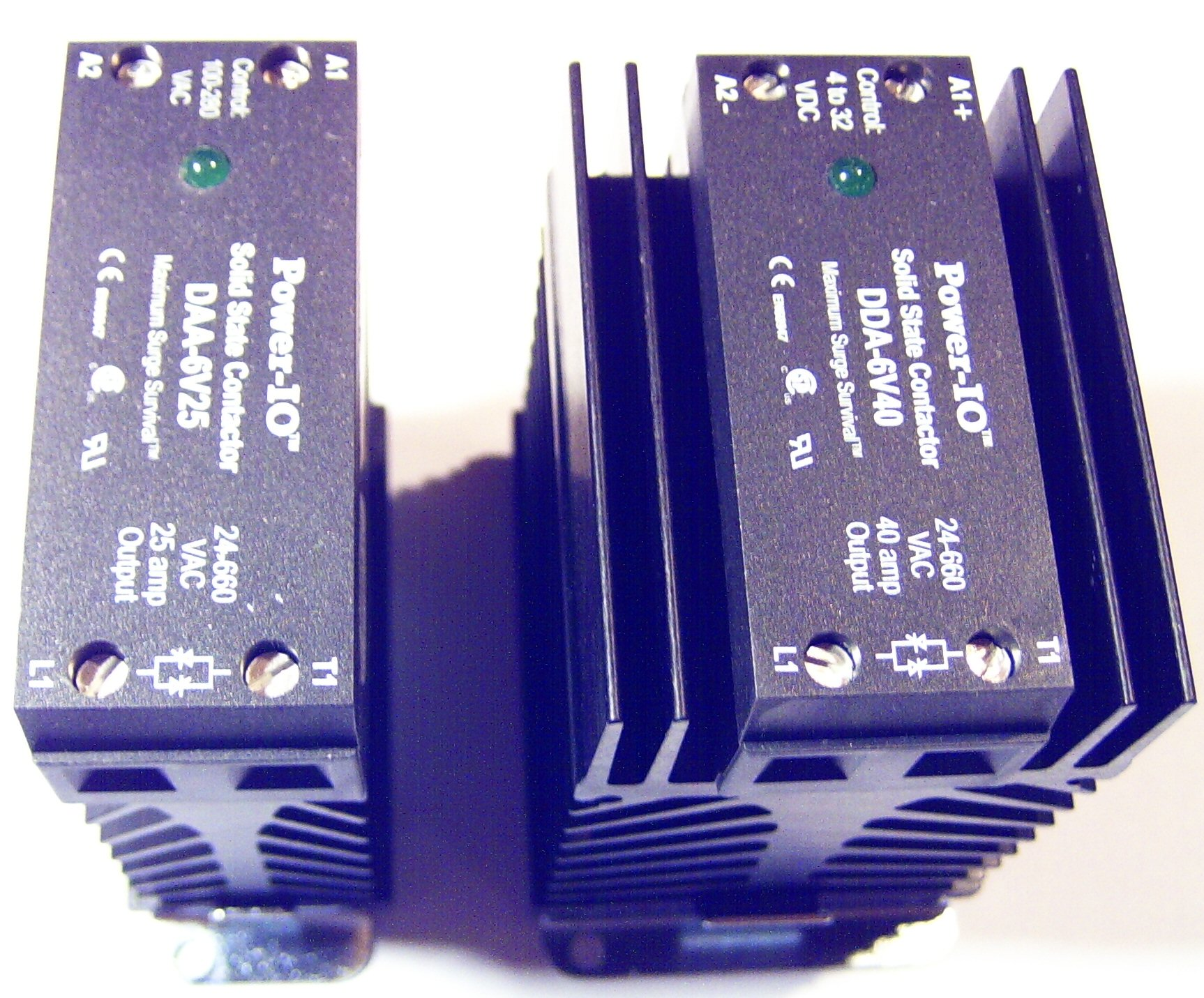
Solid state contactor

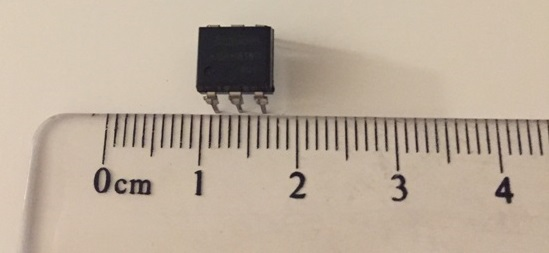
PCB mount solid-state DIL relay

== Operation ==
In alternating current (AC) circuits, silicon-controlled rectifier (SCR) and triac relays inherently switch off at the points of AC zero cross when there is zero load current. The circuit will never be interrupted in the middle of a sine wave peak, preventing the large transient voltages that would otherwise occur due to the sudden collapse of the magnetic field around the inductance. With the addition of a zero-point detector (and no adverse circuit inductance and resultant back EMF), the individual SCRs can be switched back on at the start of a new wave. This feature is called zero-crossing, or zero-crossover, switching.

An SSR based on a single MOSFET, or multiple MOSFETs in a paralleled array, can work well for direct current (DC) loads. MOSFETs have an inherent substrate diode that conducts in the reverse direction, so a single MOSFET cannot block current in both directions. For AC (bi-directional) operation two MOSFETs are arranged back-to-back with their source pins tied together. Their drain pins are connected to either side of the output. The substrate diodes are alternately reverse biased to block current when the relay is off. When the relay is on, the common source is always riding on the instantaneous signal level and both gates are biased positive relative to the source by the photo-diode.

It is common to provide access to the common source so that multiple MOSFETs can be wired in parallel if switching a DC load. Usually a network is provided to speed the turn-off of the MOSFET when the control input is removed.

SSRs for DC switching applications may use MOSFETs or IGBTs.

== Timing ==
Selection of the appropriate type of SSR is important, especially when the application calls for time critical On/Off condition with no variation.

Applications which require Time Critical On/Off switching, should use Transistor or MOSFET design types as they are not subject to the inherent Zero Cross variations that SCR or TRIAC devices will exhibit.

== Coupling ==
The control signal must be coupled to the controlled circuit in a way which provides galvanic isolation between the two circuits.

Many SSRs use optical coupling. The control voltage energizes an internal LED which illuminates and switches on a photo-sensitive diode (photo-voltaic); the diode current turns on a back-to-back thyristor (TRIAC), SCR, or MOSFET to switch the load. The optical coupling allows the control circuit to be electrically isolated from the load.

== Characteristics ==
Most of the relative advantages of solid state relays over electromechanical relays are common to all solid-state devices when compared to electromechanical devices.

- Totally silent operation.
- SSRs switch faster than electromechanical relays; the switching time of a typical optical coupling SSR is dependent on the time needed to power the LED on and off - on the order of microseconds to milliseconds.
- Increased lifetime, even if it is activated many times, as there are no moving parts to wear and no contacts to pit or build up carbon.
- Clean, bounceless operation.

== Parameters ==
SSRs are characterised by a number of parameters including the required activating input voltage, current, output voltage and current, whether it is AC or DC, voltage drop or resistance affecting output current, thermal resistance, and thermal and electrical parameters for safe operating area (e.g., derating according to thermal resistance when repeatedly switching large currents). SSRs can also include zero crossing hardware to only turn the voltage on or off when the AC voltage is at zero. Proportional SSRs can delay the onset of voltage after the zero crossing in order to lower the current output (phase angle control).
