= Opto-isolator =

Electronic component

Schematic diagram of an opto-isolator showing source of light (LED) on the left, dielectric barrier in the center, and sensor (phototransistor) on the right (Note: Real-world schematic diagrams omit the barrier symbol, and use a single set of directional arrows.)

An opto-isolator (also called an optocoupler, photocoupler, or optical isolator) is an electronic component that transfers electrical signals between two isolated circuits by using light. Opto-isolators prevent high voltages from affecting the system receiving the signal. Commercially available opto-isolators withstand input-to-output voltages up to 10 kV and voltage transients with speeds up to 25 kV/μs.

A common type of opto-isolator consists of an LED and a phototransistor in the same opaque package. Other types of source-sensor combinations include LED-photodiode, LED-LASCR, and lamp-photoresistor pairs. Usually opto-isolators transfer digital (on-off) signals and can act as an electronic switch, but some techniques allow them to be used with analog signals.

== History ==
The value of optically coupling a solid state light emitter to a semiconductor detector for the purpose of electrical isolation was recognized in 1963 by Akmenkalns, et al. (US patent 3,417,249). Photoresistor-based opto-isolators were introduced in 1968. They are the slowest, but also the most linear isolators and still retain a niche market in the audio and music industries. Commercialization of LED technology in 1968–1970 caused a boom in optoelectronics, and by the end of the 1970s the industry developed all principal types of opto-isolators. The majority of opto-isolators on the market use bipolar silicon phototransistor sensors. They attain medium data transfer speed, sufficient for applications like electroencephalography. The fastest opto-isolators use PIN diodes in photoconductive mode.

== Operation ==
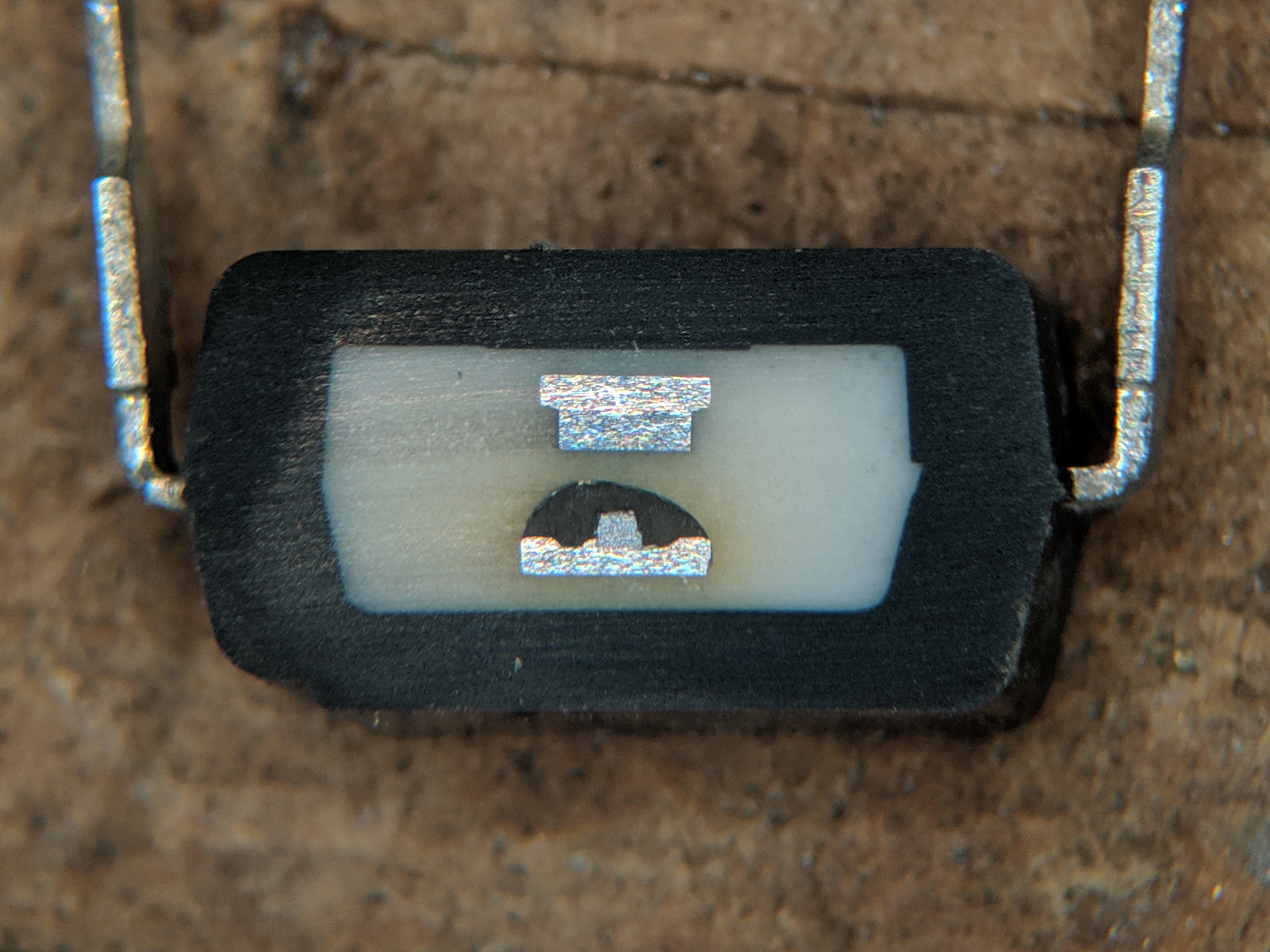
Cross section of an opto-isolator

An opto-isolator contains a source (emitter) of light, almost always a near infrared light-emitting diode (LED), that converts electrical input signal into light, a closed optical channel (also called dielectrical channel), and a photosensor, which detects incoming light and either generates electric energy directly, or modulates electric current flowing from an external power supply. The sensor can be a photoresistor, a photodiode, a phototransistor, a silicon-controlled rectifier (SCR) or a triac. Since LEDs can sense light in addition to emitting it, construction of symmetrical, bidirectional opto-isolators is possible. An optocoupled solid-state relay contains a photodiode opto-isolator which drives a power switch, usually a complementary pair of MOSFETs. A slotted optical switch contains a source of light and a sensor, but its optical channel is open, allowing modulation of light by external objects obstructing the path of light or reflecting light into the sensor.

== Electric isolation ==
Planar (top) and silicone dome (bottom) layouts – cross-section through a standard dual in-line package. Relative sizes of LED (red) and sensor (green) are exaggerated. (Note: Based on conceptual drawings published by Basso and by Mims, p. 100. Real-world LEDs and sensors are much smaller; see the photograph in Avago, p. 3 for an example.)

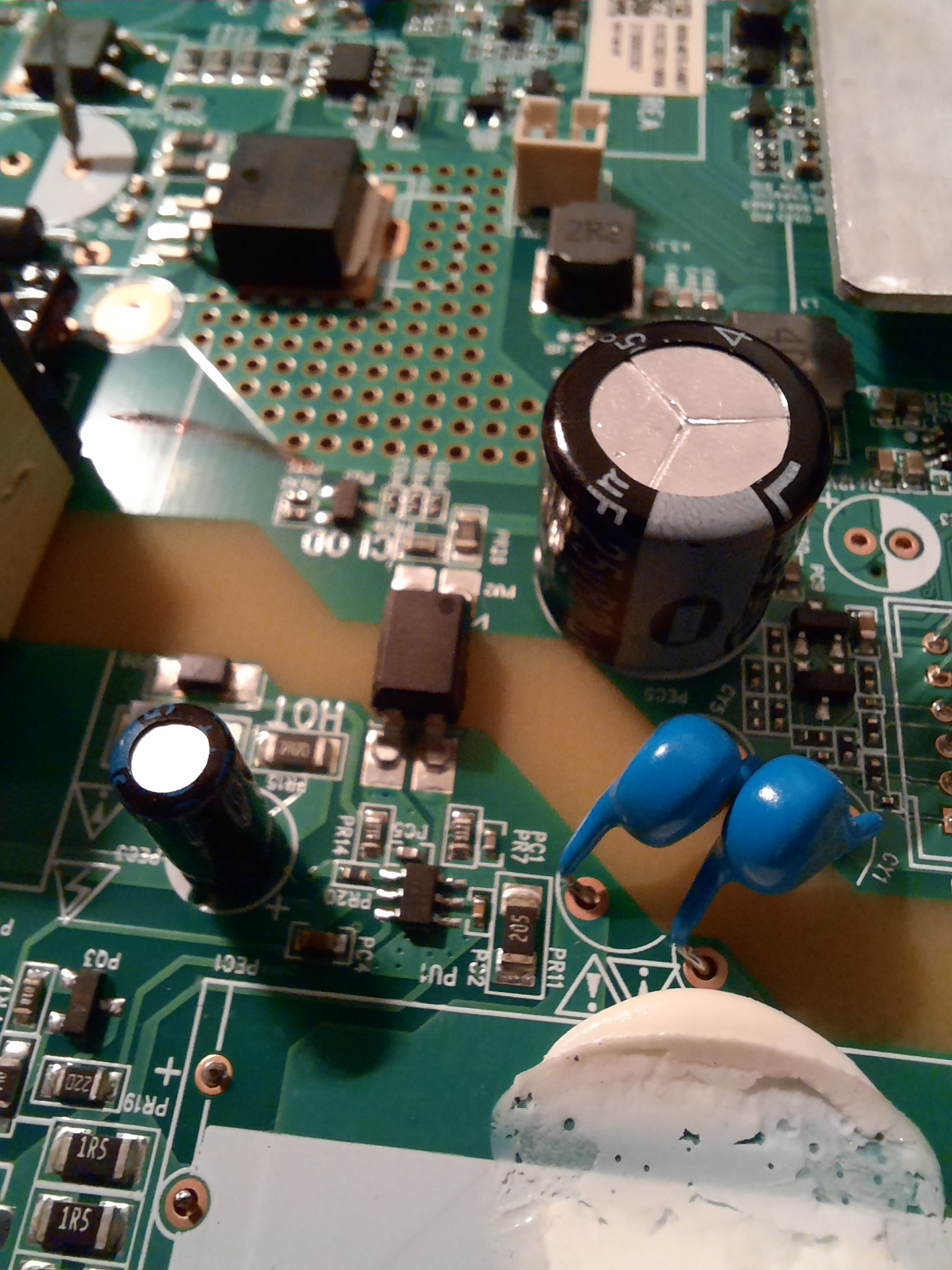
Optocoupler on a circuit board. Note the pair of class Y1 safety capacitors.

Electronic equipment and signal and power transmission lines can be subjected to voltage surges induced by lightning, electrostatic discharge, radio frequency transmissions, switching pulses (spikes) and perturbations in power supply. Remote lightning strikes can induce surges up to 10 kV, one thousand times more than the voltage limits of many electronic components. A circuit can also incorporate high voltages by design, in which case it needs safe, reliable means of interfacing its high-voltage components with low-voltage ones.

The main function of an opto-isolator is to block such high voltages and voltage transients, so that a surge in one part of the system will not disrupt or destroy the other parts. Historically, this function was delegated to isolation transformers, which use inductive coupling between galvanically isolated input and output sides. Transformers and opto-isolators are the only two classes of electronic devices that offer reinforced protection — they protect both the equipment and the human user operating this equipment. They contain a single physical isolation barrier, but provide protection equivalent to double isolation. Safety, testing and approval of opto-couplers are regulated by national and international standards: IEC 60747-5-2, EN (CENELEC) 60747-5-2, UL 1577, CSA Component Acceptance Notice #5, etc. Opto-isolator specifications published by manufacturers always follow at least one of these regulatory frameworks.

An opto-isolator connects input and output sides with a beam of light modulated by input current. It transforms useful input signal into light, sends it across the dielectric channel, captures light on the output side and transforms it back into electric signal. Unlike transformers, which pass energy in both directions (Note: A transformer can have as many coils as necessary. Each coil can act as a primary, pumping energy into a common magnetic core, or as a secondary – picking up energy stored in the core.) with very low losses, opto-isolators are unidirectional (see exceptions) and they cannot transmit power. Typical opto-isolators can only modulate the flow of energy already present on the output side. Unlike transformers, opto-isolators can pass DC or slow-moving signals and do not require matching impedances between input and output sides. (Note: The input side circuitry and the LED must be matched, the output side and the sensor must be matched, but there is, usually, no need to match input and output sides.) Both transformers and opto-isolators are effective in breaking ground loops, common in industrial and stage equipment, caused by high or noisy return currents in ground wires.

The physical layout of an opto-isolator depends primarily on the desired isolation voltage. Devices rated for less than a few kV have planar (or sandwich) construction. The sensor die is mounted directly on the lead frame of its package (usually, a six-pin or a four-pin dual in-line package). The sensor is covered with a sheet of glass or clear plastic, which is topped with the LED die. The LED beam fires downward. To minimize losses of light, the useful absorption spectrum of the sensor must match the output spectrum of the LED, which almost invariably lies in the near infrared. The optical channel is made as thin as possible for a desired breakdown voltage. For example, to be rated for short-term voltages of 3.75 kV and transients of 1 kV/μs, the clear polyimide sheet in the Avago ASSR-300 series is only 0.08 mm thick. Breakdown voltages of planar assemblies depend on the thickness of the transparent sheet and the configuration of bonding wires that connect the dies with external pins. Real in-circuit isolation voltage is further reduced by creepage over the PCB and the surface of the package. Safe design rules require a minimal clearance of 25 mm/kV for bare metal conductors or 8.3 mm/kV for coated conductors.

Opto-isolators rated for 2.5 to 6 kV employ a different layout called silicone dome. Here, the LED and sensor dies are placed on the opposite sides of the package; the LED fires into the sensor horizontally. The LED, the sensor and the gap between them are encapsulated in a blob, or dome, of transparent silicone. The dome acts as a reflector, retaining all stray light and reflecting it onto the surface of the sensor, minimizing losses in a relatively long optical channel. In double mold designs the space between the silicone blob ("inner mold") and the outer shell ("outer mold") is filled with dark dielectric compound with a matched coefficient of thermal expansion.

== Types of opto-isolators ==
Device type (Note: See Horowitz and Hill, p. 597, for an expanded list of opto-isolator types with their schematic symbols and typical specifications.)	Source of light	Sensor type	Speed	Current transfer ratio
Resistive opto-isolator (Vactrol)	Incandescent light bulb	CdS or CdSe photoresistor (LDR)	Very low	<100% (Note: Current through the photoresistor (output current) is proportional to the voltage applied across it. In theory it can exceed 100% of input current, but in practice dissipation of heat according to Joule's law limits current transfer ratio at below 100%.)
Resistive opto-isolator (Vactrol)	Neon lamp	CdS or CdSe photoresistor (LDR)	Low	<100%
Resistive opto-isolator (Vactrol)	GaAs infrared LED	CdS or CdSe photoresistor (LDR)	Low	<100%
Diode opto-isolator	GaAs infrared LED	Silicon photodiode	Highest	0.1–0.2%
Transistor opto-isolator	GaAs infrared LED	Bipolar silicon phototransistor	Medium	2–120%
Transistor opto-isolator	GaAs infrared LED	Darlington phototransistor	Medium	100–600%
Opto-isolated SCR	GaAs infrared LED	Silicon-controlled rectifier	Low to medium	>100%
Opto-isolated triac	GaAs infrared LED	TRIAC	Low to medium	Very high
Solid-state relay	Stack of GaAs infrared LEDs	Stack of photodiodes driving a pair of MOSFETs or an IGBT	Low to high (Note: Low-cost solid-state relays have switching times of tens of milliseconds. Modern high-speed solid-state relays like Avago ASSR-300 series (see datasheet) attain switching times of less than 70 nanoseconds.)	Practically unlimited

=== Resistive opto-isolators ===
The earliest opto-isolators, originally marketed as light cells, emerged in the 1960s. They employed miniature incandescent light bulbs as sources of light, and cadmium sulfide (CdS) or cadmium selenide (CdSe) photoresistors (also called light-dependent resistors, LDRs) as receivers. In applications where control linearity was not important, or where available current was too low for driving an incandescent bulb (as was the case in vacuum tube amplifiers), it was replaced with a neon lamp. These devices (or just their LDR component) were commonly named Vactrols, after a trademark of Vactec, Inc. The trademark has since been genericized, (Note: According to the United States Patent and Trademark Office, trademark registered in 1969 for "photocell combined with a light source" is now dead (USPTO database record serial number 72318344. Retrieved November 5, 2010). The same trademark, registered in 1993 for "medico-surgical tubing connector sold as a component of suction catheters" is now live and owned by Mallinckrodt Inc. (USPTO database record serial number 74381130. Retrieved November 5, 2010).) but the original Vactrols are still being manufactured by PerkinElmer. (Note: Vactec was purchased by EG&G (Edgerton, Germeshausen, and Grier, Inc.), a defense contractor, in 1983. In 1999 EG&G purchased formerly independent PerkinElmer, and changed own name PerkinElmer (see reverse takeover). An unrelated company, Silonex (a division of Carlyle Group) brands its photoresistive opto-isolators Audiohm Optocouplers.)

The turn-on and turn-off lag of an incandescent bulb lies in hundreds of milliseconds range, which makes the bulb an effective low-pass filter and rectifier but limits the practical modulation frequency range to a few hertz. With the introduction of light-emitting diodes (LEDs) in 1968–1970, the manufacturers replaced incandescent and neon lamps with LEDs and achieved response times of 5 milliseconds and modulation frequencies up to 250 Hz. The name Vactrol was carried over on LED-based devices which are, as of 2010, still produced in small quantities.

Photoresistors used in opto-isolators rely on bulk effects in a uniform film of semiconductor; there are no p-n junctions. Uniquely among photosensors, photoresistors are non-polar devices suited for either AC or DC circuits. Their resistance drops in reverse proportion to the intensity of incoming light, from virtually infinity to a residual floor that may be as low as less than a hundred ohms. These properties made the original Vactrol a convenient and cheap automatic gain control and compressor for telephone networks. The photoresistors easily withstood voltages up to 400 volts, which made them ideal for driving vacuum fluorescent displays. Other industrial applications included photocopiers, industrial automation, professional light measurement instruments and auto-exposure meters. Most of these applications are now obsolete, but resistive opto-isolators retained a niche in audio, in particular guitar amplifier, markets.

American guitar and organ manufacturers of the 1960s embraced the resistive opto-isolator as a convenient and cheap tremolo modulator. Fender's early tremolo effects used two vacuum tubes; after 1964 one of these tubes was replaced by an optocoupler made of an LDR and a neon lamp. To date, Vactrols activated by pressing the stompbox pedal are ubiquitous in the music industry. Shortages of genuine PerkinElmer Vactrols forced the DIY guitar community to "roll their own" resistive opto-isolators. Guitarists to date prefer opto-isolated effects because their superior separation of audio and control grounds results in "inherently high quality of the sound". However, the distortion introduced by a photoresistor at line level signal is higher than that of a professional electrically coupled voltage-controlled amplifier. Performance is further compromised by slow fluctuations of resistance owing to light history, a memory effect inherent in cadmium compounds. Such fluctuations take hours to settle and can be only partially offset with feedback in the control circuit.

=== Photodiode opto-isolators ===
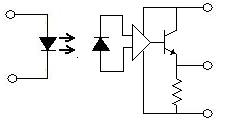
A fast photodiode opto-isolator with an output-side amplifier circuit

Diode opto-isolators employ LEDs as sources of light and silicon photodiodes as sensors. When the photodiode is reverse-biased with an external voltage source, incoming light increases the reverse current flowing through the diode. The diode itself does not generate energy; it modulates the flow of energy from an external source. This mode of operation is called photoconductive mode. Alternatively, in the absence of external bias the diode converts the energy of light into electric energy by charging its terminals to a voltage of up to 0.7 V. The rate of charge is proportional to the intensity of incoming light. The energy is harvested by draining the charge through an external high-impedance path; the ratio of current transfer can reach 0.2%. This mode of operation is called photovoltaic mode.

The fastest opto-isolators employ PIN diodes in photoconductive mode. The response times of PIN diodes lie in the subnanosecond range; overall system speed is limited by delays in LED output and in biasing circuitry. To minimize these delays, fast digital opto-isolators contain their own LED drivers and output amplifiers optimized for speed. These devices are called full logic opto-isolators: their LEDs and sensors are fully encapsulated within a digital logic circuit. The Hewlett-Packard 6N137/HPCL2601 family of devices equipped with internal output amplifiers was introduced in the late 1970s and attained 10 MBd data transfer speeds. It remained an industry standard until the introduction of the 50 MBd Agilent Technologies (Note: The former semiconductor division of Agilent Technologies operates as an independent company, Avago Technologies, since 2005.) 7723/0723 family in 2002. The 7723/0723 series opto-isolators contain CMOS LED drivers and a CMOS buffered amplifiers, which require two independent external power supplies of 5 V each.

Photodiode opto-isolators can be used for interfacing analog signals, although their non-linearity invariably distorts the signal. A special class of analog opto-isolators introduced by Burr-Brown uses two photodiodes and an input-side operational amplifier to compensate for diode non-linearity. One of two identical diodes is wired into the feedback loop of the amplifier, which maintains overall current transfer ratio at a constant level regardless of the non-linearity in the second (output) diode.

A novel idea of a particular optical analog signal isolator was submitted on 3, June 2011. The proposed configuration consist of two different parts. One of them transfers the signal, and the other establishes a negative feedback to ensure that the output signal has the same features as the input signal. This proposed analog isolator is linear over a wide range of input voltage and frequency. However linear opto couplers using this principle have been available for many years, for example the IL300.

Solid-state relays built around MOSFET switches usually employ a photodiode opto-isolator to drive the switch. The gate of a MOSFET requires relatively small total charge to turn on and its leakage current in steady state is very low. A photodiode in photovoltaic mode can generate turn-on charge in a reasonably short time but its output voltage is many times less than the MOSFET's threshold voltage. To reach the required threshold, solid-state relays contain stacks of up to thirty photodiodes wired in series.

=== Phototransistor opto-isolators ===
Phototransistors are inherently slower than photodiodes. The earliest and the slowest but still common 4N35 opto-isolator, for example, has rise and fall times of 5 μs into a 100 ohm load and its bandwidth is limited at around 10 kilohertz - sufficient for applications like electroencephalography or pulse-width motor control. Devices like PC-900 or 6N138 recommended in the original 1983 Musical Instrument Digital Interface specification allow digital data transfer speeds of tens of kiloBauds. Phototransistors must be properly biased and loaded to achieve their maximum speeds, for example, the 4N28 operates at up to 50 kHz with optimum bias and less than 4 kHz without it.

Design with transistor opto-isolators requires generous allowances for wide fluctuations of parameters found in commercially available devices. Such fluctuations may be destructive, for example, when an opto-isolator in the feedback loop of a DC-to-DC converter changes its transfer function and causes spurious oscillations, or when unexpected delays in opto-isolators cause a short circuit through one side of an H-bridge. Manufacturers' datasheets typically list only worst-case values for critical parameters; actual devices surpass these worst-case estimates in an unpredictable fashion. Bob Pease observed that current transfer ratio in a batch of 4N28's can vary from 15% to more than 100%; the datasheet specified only a minimum of 10%. Transistor beta in the same batch can vary from 300 to 3000, resulting in 10:1 variance in bandwidth.

Opto-isolators using field-effect transistors (FETs) as sensors are rare and, like vactrols, can be used as remote-controlled analog potentiometers provided that the voltage across the FET's output terminal does not exceed a few hundred mV. Opto-FETs turn on without injecting switching charge in the output circuit, which is particularly useful in sample and hold circuits.

=== Bidirectional opto-isolators ===
All opto-isolators described so far are uni-directional. Optical channel always works one way, from the source (LED) to the sensor. The sensors, be they photoresistors, photodiodes or phototransistors, cannot emit light. (Note: Exception: Ternary and quaternary GaAsP photodiodes can generate light. - Mims, p. 102.) But LEDs, like all semiconductor diodes, (Note: "Even the garden variety signal diodes you use in circuits have a small photovoltaic effect. There are amusing stories of bizarre circuit behavior finally traced to this." - Horowitz and Hill McCoulny, p. 184.) are capable of detecting incoming light, which makes possible construction of a two-way opto-isolator from a pair of LEDs. The simplest bidirectional opto-isolator is merely a pair of LEDs placed face to face and held together with heat-shrink tubing. If necessary, the gap between two LEDs can be extended with a glass fiber insert.

Visible spectrum LEDs have relatively poor transfer efficiency, thus near infrared spectrum GaAs, GaAs:Si and AlGaAs:Si LEDs are the preferred choice for bidirectional devices. Bidirectional opto-isolators built around pairs of GaAs:Si LEDs have current transfer ratio of around 0.06% in either photovoltaic or photoconductive mode — less than photodiode-based isolators, but sufficiently practical for real-world applications.

== Types of configurations ==
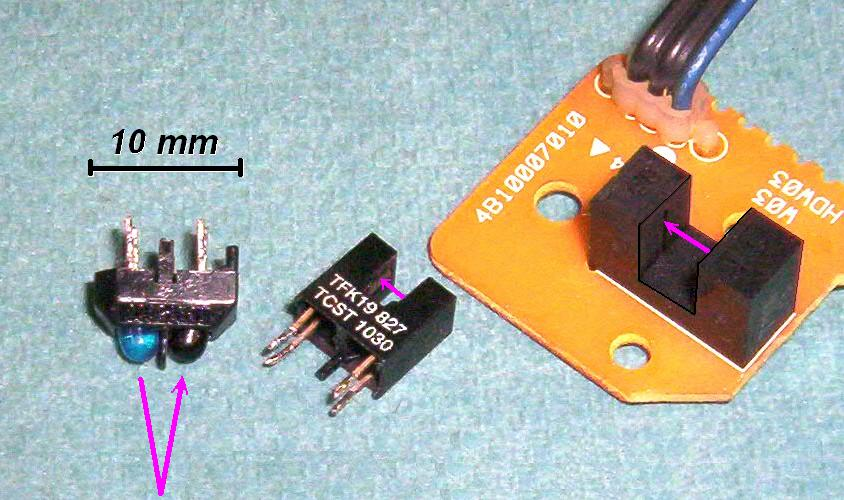
A reflective pair (left) and two slotted couplers with the light paths in purple

Usually, optocouplers have a closed pair configuration. This configuration refers to optocouplers enclosed in a dark container wherein the source and sensor are facing each other.

Some optocouplers have a slotted coupler/interrupter configuration. This configuration refers to optocouplers with an open slot between the source and sensor that has the ability to influence incoming signals. The slotted coupler/interrupter configuration is suitable for object detection, vibration detection, and bounce-free switching.

Some optocouplers have a reflective pair configuration. This configuration refers to optocouplers that contain a source that emits light and a sensor that only detects light when it has reflected off an object. The reflective pair configuration is suitable for the development of tachometers, movement detectors and reflectance monitors.

The later two configurations are frequently referred to as optosensors or photoelectric sensors.

== See also ==
- Galvanic isolation

== Sources ==
- S. Ananthi (2006). A text book of medical instruments. New Age International. ISBN 81-224-1572-5.
- Avago Technologies (2010). Safety Considerations When Using Optocouplers and Alternative Isolators for Providing Protection Against Electrical Hazards. January 2010. Retrieved November 5, 2010.
- Stuart R. Ball (2004). Analog interfacing to embedded microprocessor systems. Elsevier. ISBN 0-7506-7723-6.
- Christophe Basso (2009). Dealing with Low-Current Optocouplers. Energy Efficiency and Technology, September 1, 2009. Retrieved November 2, 2010.
- Ashok Bindra (2000). MEMs-Based Magnetic Coils Exceed The Limitation Of Optical Couplers . Electronic Design, July 24, 2000. Retrieved November 4, 2010.
- Geoffrey Bottrill, Derek Cheyne, G. Vijayaraghavan (2005). Practical electrical equipment and installations in hazardous areas. Newnes. ISBN 0-7506-6398-7.
- Nicholas Collins (2009). Handmade Electronic Music: The Art of Hardware Hacking. Taylor & Francis. ISBN 0-415-99873-5.
- Ritchie Fliegler, Jon F. Eiche (1993). Amps!: the other half of rock 'n' roll. Hal Leonard Corporation. ISBN 0-7935-2411-3.
- Rudolf F. Graf (1999). Modern dictionary of electronics. Newnes. ISBN 0-7506-9866-7.
- Peter Hasse (2000). Overvoltage protection of low voltage systems. IET. ISBN 0-85296-781-0.
- Paul Horowitz, Winfield Hill (2006). The Art of Electronics. Cambridge University Press. ISBN 0-521-37095-7.
- Alexander Jaus (2005). Navigating the Regulatory Maze with Optocouplers. Power Electronics Technology, May 2005, pp. 48–52.
- Elya B. Joffe, Kai-Sang Lock (2010). Grounds for Grounding: A Circuit to System Handbook. Wiley-IEEE. ISBN 0-471-66008-6.
- S. Kaeriyama, S. Uchida, M. Furumiya, M. Okada, M. Mizuno (2010). A 2.5kV Isolation 35kV/us CMR 250 Mbps 0.13mA/Mbps Digital Isolator in Standard CMOS with an On-Chip Small Transformer. IEEE 2010 Symposium on VLSI Circuits. Honolulu, June 16–18, 2010. ISBN 1-4244-5454-9. pp. 197–198.
- Linda Kincaid (2010). Analog Devices Introduces Digital Isolator with Integrated Transformer Driver and PWM Controller. Analog Devices. October 21, 2010. Retrieved November 3, 2010.
- Jeremy Seah Eng Lee, Alexander Jaus, Patrick Sullivan, Chua Teck Bee (2005). Building a Safe and Robust Industrial System with Avago Technologies Optocouplers. Avago Technologies. Retrieved November 2, 2010.
- Herbert F. Mataré (1978). Light-Emitting Devices, Part II: Device Design and Applications. Advances in electronics and electron physics, Volume 45 (1978), ISBN 0-12-014645-2, pp. 40–200.
- Forrest M. Mims (2000). Mims Circuit Scrapbook (volume 2). Newnes. ISBN 1-878707-49-3.
- John Myers (2002). Magnetic Couplers in Industrial Systems . Sensor Magazine. March 2002. Retrieved November 4, 2010.
- NVE Corporation (2007). Application Bulletin AB-7. GMR in Isolation. March 2007. Retrieved November 4, 2010.
- Robert A. Pease (1991). Troubleshooting Analog Circuits. Newnes. ISBN 0-7506-9499-8.
- PerkinElmer (2001). Photoconductive Cells and Analog Optoisolators (Vactrols). Retrieved November 2, 2010.
- Dan I. Porat, Arpad Barna (1979). Introduction to digital techniques. Wiley. ISBN 0-471-02924-6.
- E. Fred Schubert (2006). Light-emitting diodes. Cambridge University Press. ISBN 0-521-86538-7.
- Silonex (2002). Audio level control with resistive optocouplers. (PDF version). Retrieved November 2, 2010.
- John Teagle, John Sprung (1995). Fender Amps: The First Fifty Years. Hal Leonard Corporation. ISBN 0-7935-3733-9.
- Vishay Semiconductors (2008). Application Note 56. Solid State Relays. June 4, 2008. Retrieved November 5, 2010.
- Gerald Weber (1997). Tube Amp Talk for the Guitarist and Tech. Hal Leonard Corporation. ISBN 0-9641060-1-9.
