= Solid-state electronics =

Electronics with semiconductor components

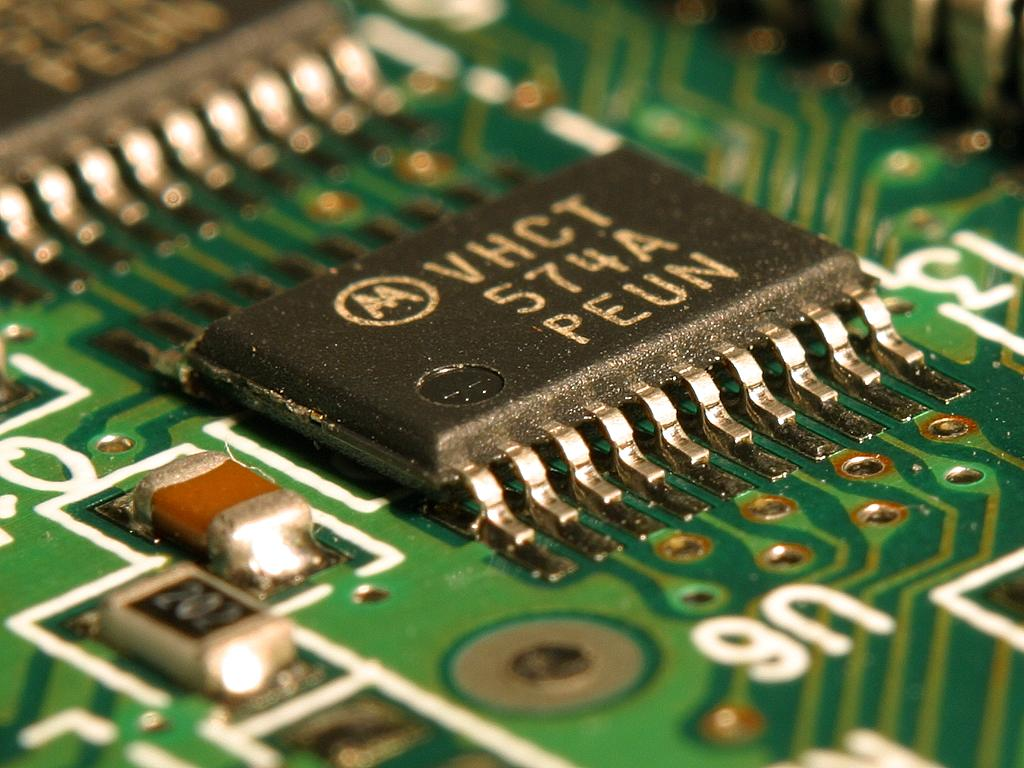
An integrated circuit (IC) on a printed circuit board. This is called a solid-state circuit because all of the electrical activity in the circuit occurs within solid materials.

Solid-state electronics are semiconductor electronics: electronic equipment that use semiconductor devices such as transistors, diodes and integrated circuits (ICs). The term is also used as an adjective for devices in which semiconductor electronics that have no moving parts replace devices with moving parts, such as the solid-state relay, in which transistor switches are used in place of a moving-arm electromechanical relay, or the solid-state drive (SSD), a type of semiconductor memory used in computers to replace hard disk drives, which store data on rotating disks.

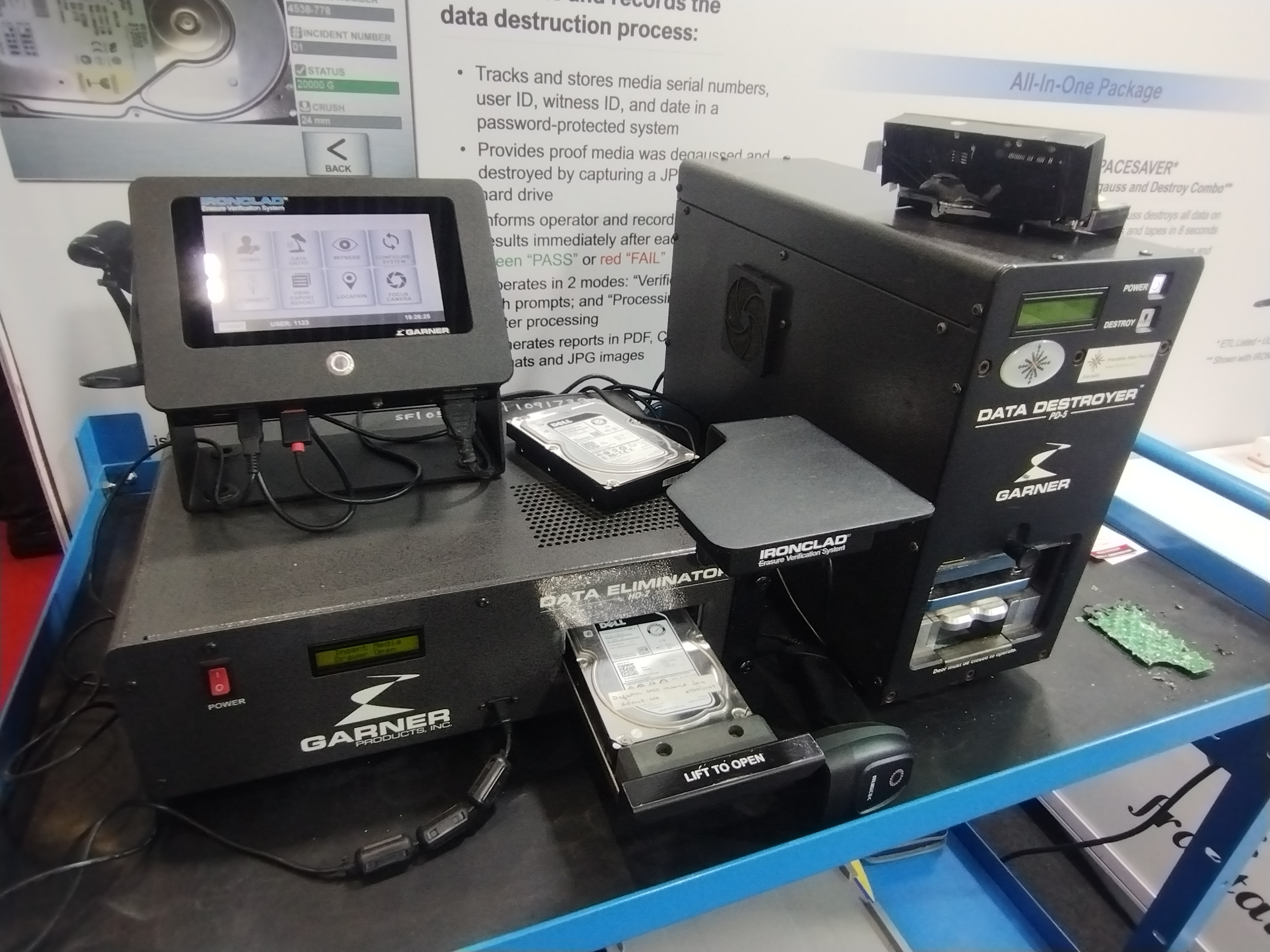
Garner Ironclad, a solid state media erasure and destruction verification system at DEF-TECH Bharat 2026 exhibition, KTPO, Bengaluru

== History ==
The term "solid-state" gained popularity during the 1960s semiconductor boom to differentiate the new technology from traditional vacuum tubes.

Unlike vacuum tubes, which control an electric current of electrons or ions through a sealed vacuum, solid-state devices manipulate charge carriers (electrons or holes) entirely within a solid crystalline semiconductor material like silicon.

Although the first solid-state electronic device was the cat's whisker detector, a crude semiconductor diode invented around 1904, solid-state electronics started with the invention of the transistor in 1947. Before that, all electronic equipment used vacuum tubes, because vacuum tubes were the only electronic components that could amplify—an essential capability in all electronics. The transistor, which was invented by John Bardeen and Walter Houser Brattain while working under William Shockley at Bell Laboratories in 1947, could also amplify, and replaced vacuum tubes. The first transistor hi-fi system was developed by engineers at GE and demonstrated in 1955 in Philadelphia at the University of Pennsylvania. In terms of commercial production, The Fisher TR-1 was the first "all transistor" preamplifier, which became available mid-1956. In 1961, a company named Transis-tronics released a solid-state amplifier, the TEC S-15.

The replacement of bulky, fragile, energy-hungry vacuum tubes by transistors in the 1960s and 1970s created a revolution not just in technology but in people's habits, making possible the first truly portable consumer electronics such as the transistor radio, cassette tape player, walkie-talkie and quartz watch, as well as the first practical computers and mobile phones. Other examples of solid state electronic devices are the microprocessor chip, LED lamp, solar cell, charge coupled device (CCD) image sensor used in cameras, and semiconductor laser.

Also during the 1960s and 1970s, television set manufacturers switched from vacuum tubes to semiconductors, and advertised sets as "100% solid state" even though the cathode-ray tube (CRT) was still a vacuum tube. This meant only the chassis was 100% solid-state, not including the CRT. Early advertisements spelled out this distinction, but later advertisements assumed the audience had already been educated about it and shortened it to just "100% solid state". LED displays can be said to be truly 100% solid-state.

== See also ==
- Condensed matter physics
- Materials science
- Solar cell
- Solid-state physics
- Power management integrated circuit
