= Electronic component =

Discrete device in an electronic system

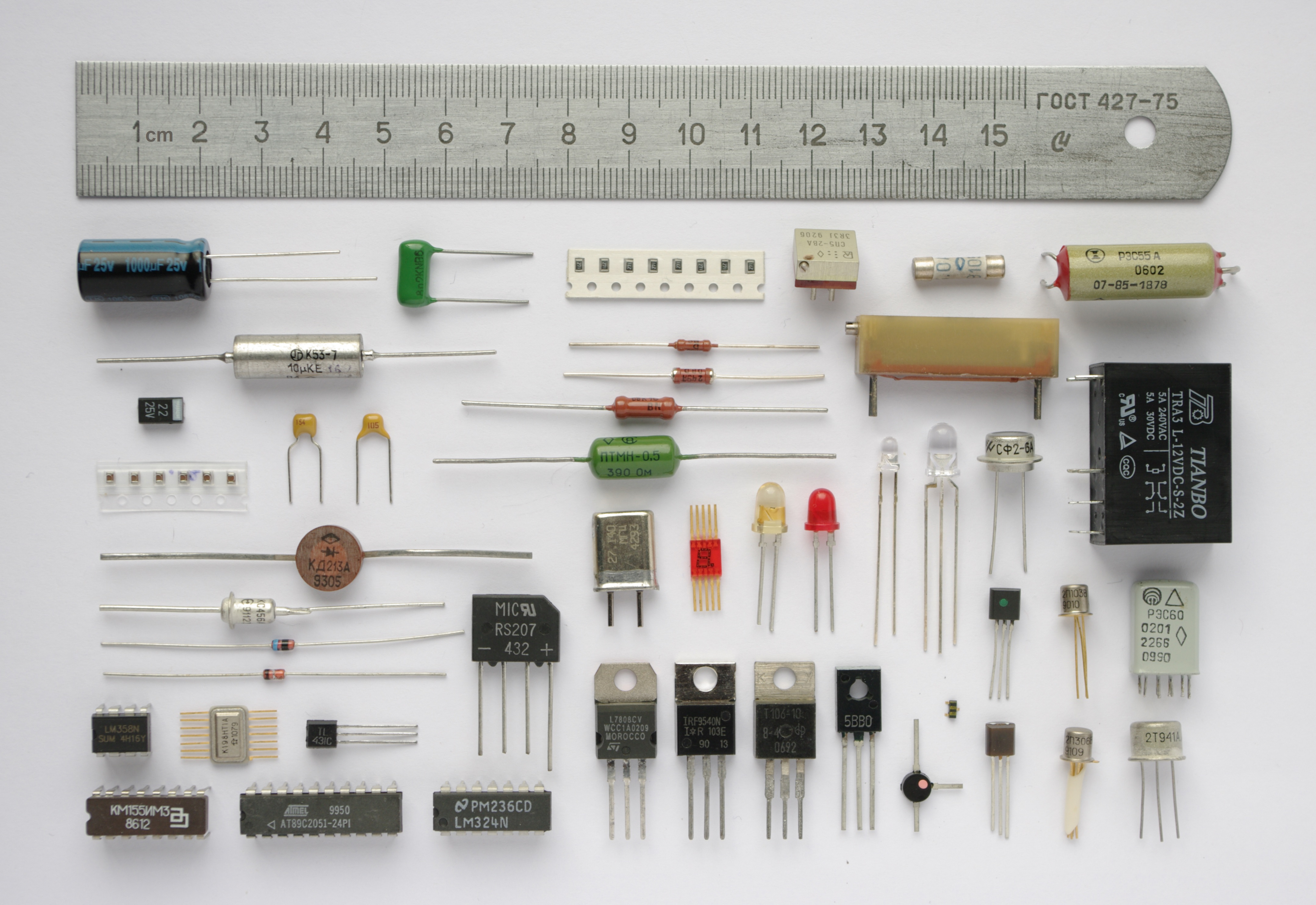
Various electronic components, with a 15 cm ruler to scale.

An electronic component is any basic discrete electronic device or physical entity part of an electronic system used to affect electrons or their associated fields. Electronic components are mostly industrial products, available in a singular form and are not to be confused with electrical elements, which are conceptual abstractions representing idealized electronic components and elements. A datasheet for an electronic component is a technical document that provides detailed information about the component's specifications, characteristics, and performance. Discrete circuits are made of individual electronic components that only perform one function each as packaged, which are known as discrete components, although strictly the term discrete component refers to such a component with semiconductor material such as individual transistors.

Electronic components have a number of electrical terminals or leads. These leads connect to other electrical components, often over wire, to create an electronic circuit with a particular function (for example an amplifier, radio receiver, or oscillator). Basic electronic components may be packaged discretely, as arrays or networks of like components, or integrated inside of packages such as semiconductor integrated circuits, hybrid integrated circuits, or thick film devices. The following list of electronic components focuses on the discrete version of these components, treating such packages as components in their own right.

== Classification ==
Components can be classified as passive, active, or electromechanical. The strict physics definition treats passive components as ones that cannot supply energy themselves, whereas a battery would be seen as an active component since it truly acts as a source of energy.

However, electronic engineers who perform circuit analysis use a more restrictive definition of passivity. When only concerned with the energy of signals, it is convenient to ignore the so-called DC circuit and pretend that the power supplying components such as transistors or integrated circuits is absent (as if each such component had its own battery built in), though it may in reality be supplied by the DC circuit. Then, the analysis only concerns the AC circuit, an abstraction that ignores DC voltages and currents (and the power associated with them) present in the real-life circuit. This fiction, for instance, lets us view an oscillator as "producing energy" even though in reality the oscillator consumes even more energy from a DC power supply, which we have chosen to ignore. Under that restriction, we define the terms as used in circuit analysis as:

- Active components rely on a source of energy (usually from the DC circuit, which we have chosen to ignore) and usually can inject power into a circuit, though this is not part of the definition. Active components include amplifying components such as transistors, triode vacuum tubes (valves), and tunnel diodes.
- Passive components cannot introduce net energy into the circuit. They also cannot rely on a source of power, except for what is available from the (AC) circuit they are connected to. As a consequence, they cannot amplify (increase the power of a signal), although they may increase a voltage or current (such as is done by a transformer or resonant circuit). Passive components include two-terminal components such as resistors, capacitors, inductors, and transformers.
- Electromechanical components can carry out electrical operations by using moving parts or by using electrical connections.

Most passive components with more than two terminals can be described in terms of two-port parameters that satisfy the principle of reciprocity—though there are rare exceptions. In contrast, active components (with more than two terminals) generally lack that property.

== Active components ==
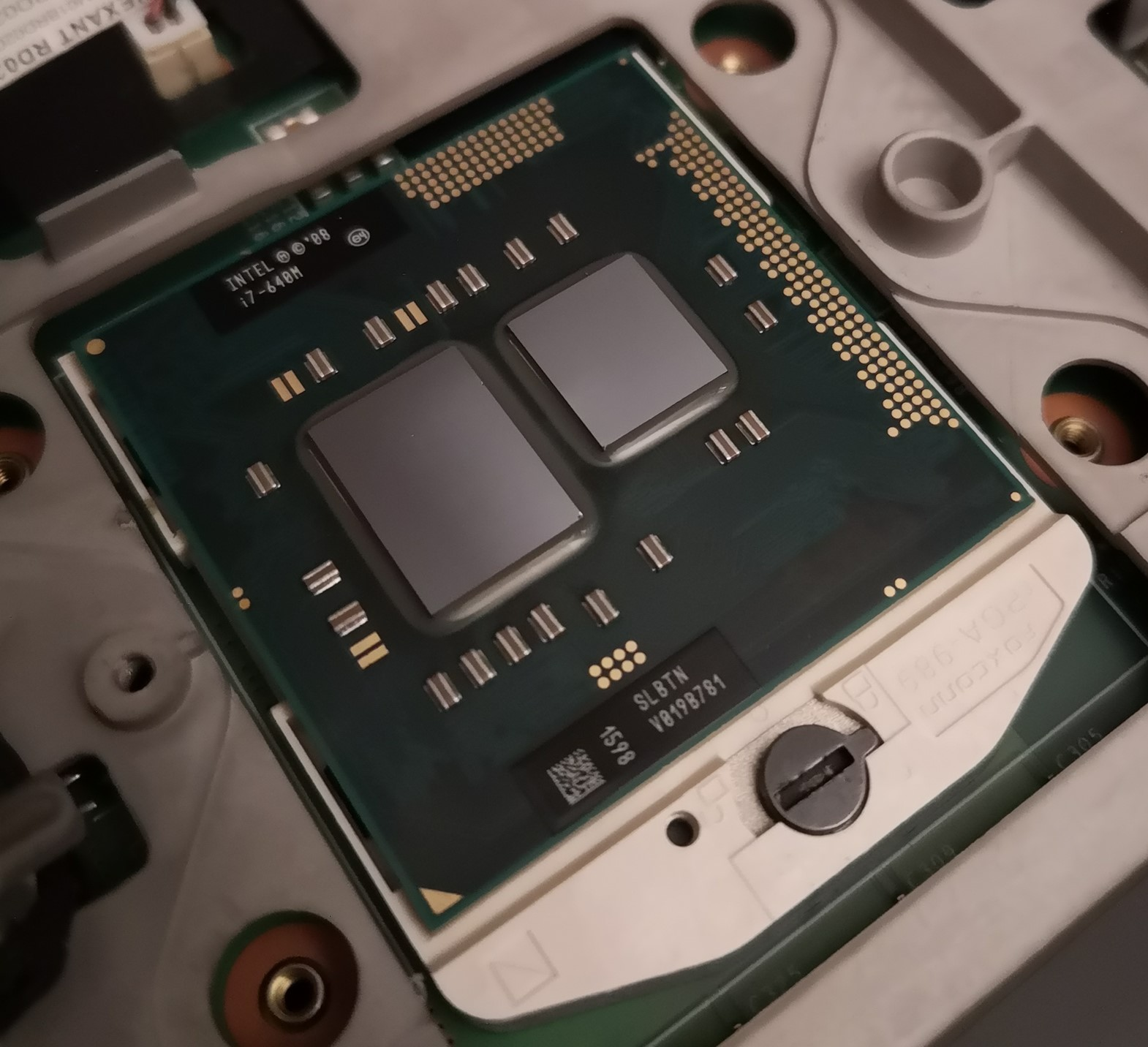
A microprocessor, an advanced electronic component

=== Semiconductors ===
==== Transistors ====
Transistors were considered the invention of the twentieth century that changed electronic circuits forever. A transistor is a semiconductor device used to amplify and switch electronic signals and electrical power.

- Field-effect transistors (FET)
  - MOSFET (metal–oxide–semiconductor FET) – by far the most widely manufactured electronic component (also known as MOS transistor)
    - PMOS (p-type MOS)
    - NMOS (n-type MOS)
    - CMOS (complementary MOS)
    - Power MOSFET
      - LDMOS (lateral diffused MOSFET)
    - MuGFET (multi-gate field-effect transistor)
      - FinFET (fin field-effect transistor)
    - TFT (thin-film transistor)
  - FeFET (ferroelectric field-effect transistor)
  - CNTFET (carbon nanotube field-effect transistor)
  - JFET (junction field-effect transistor) – N-channel or P-channel
    - SIT (static induction transistor)
  - MESFET (metal semiconductor FET)
  - HEMT (high-electron-mobility transistor)
- Composite transistors
  - BiCMOS (bipolar CMOS)
  - IGBT (Insulated-gate bipolar transistor)
- Other transistors
  - Bipolar junction transistor (BJT, or simply "transistor") – NPN or PNP
    - Photo transistor – amplified photodetector
  - Darlington transistor – NPN or PNP
    - Photo Darlington – amplified photodetector
  - Sziklai pair (compound transistor, complementary Darlington)
  - Tetrode transistor – is any transistor having four active terminals.
- Thyristors
  - Silicon-controlled rectifier (SCR) – passes current only after triggered by a sufficient control voltage on its gate
  - TRIAC (TRIode for Alternating Current) – bidirectional SCR
  - Unijunction transistor (UJT)
  - Programmable Unijunction transistor (PUT)
  - SITh (static induction thyristor)

==== Diodes ====
Conduct electricity easily in one direction, among more specific behaviors.

- Diode, rectifier, diode bridge
- Schottky diode (hot carrier diode) – super fast diode with lower forward voltage drop
- Zener diode – allows current to flow "backwards" when a specific set voltage is reached.
- Transient voltage suppression diode (TVS), unipolar or bipolar – used to absorb high-voltage spikes
- Varicap, tuning diode, varactor, variable capacitance diode – a diode whose AC capacitance varies according to the DC voltage applied.

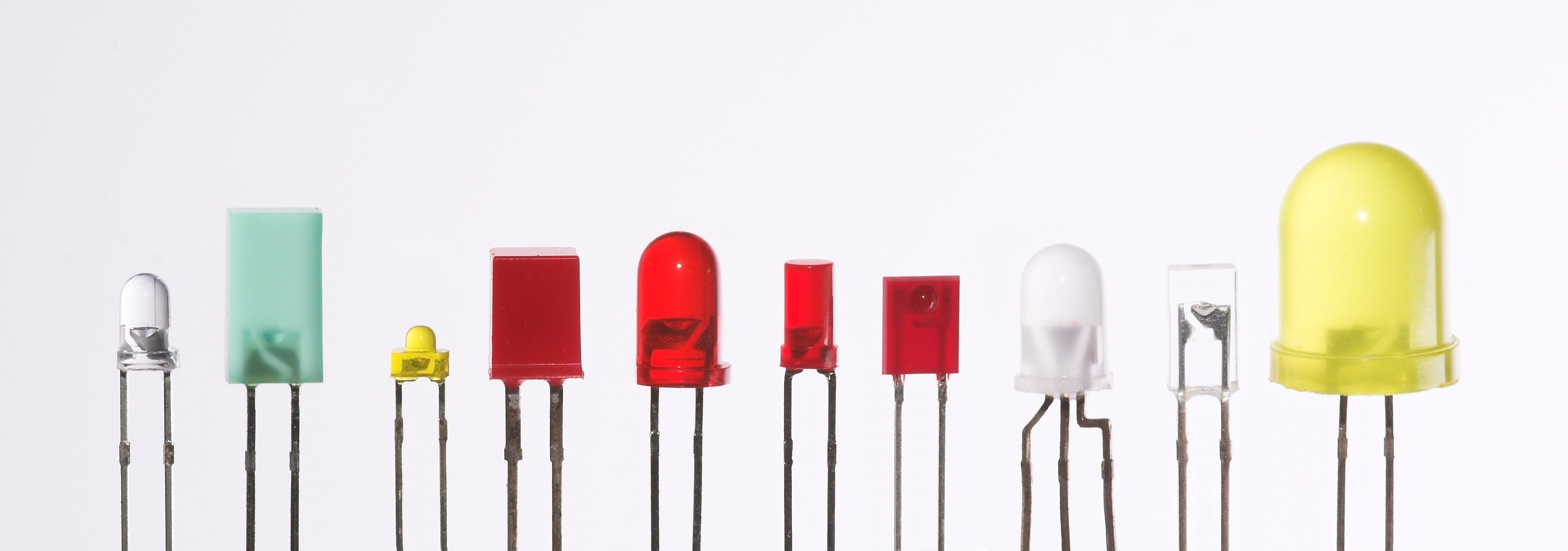
Various examples of Light-emitting diodes

- Laser diode
- Light-emitting diode (LED) – a diode that emits light
- Photodiode – passes current in proportion to incident light
  - Avalanche photodiode – photodiode with internal gain
  - Solar Cell, photovoltaic cell, PV array or panel – produces power from light
- DIAC (diode for alternating current), Trigger Diode, SIDAC) – often used to trigger an SCR
- Constant-current diode
- Step recovery diode
- Tunnel diode - very fast diode based on quantum mechanical tunneling

==== Integrated circuits ====
Integrated Circuits can serve a variety of purposes, including acting as a timer, performing digital to analog conversion, performing amplification, or being used for logical operations.

- Integrated circuit (IC)
  - MOS integrated circuit (MOS IC)
  - Hybrid integrated circuit (hybrid IC)
  - Mixed-signal integrated circuit
  - Three-dimensional integrated circuit (3D IC)
- Digital electronics
  - Logic gate
  - Microcontroller
- Analog circuit
  - Hall-effect sensor – senses a magnetic field
  - Current sensor – senses a current through it

==== Programmable devices ====
- Programmable logic device
  - Field-programmable gate array (FPGA)
  - Complex programmable logic device (CPLD)
- Field-programmable analog array (FPAA)

==== Optoelectronic devices ====
- Opto-electronics
  - Opto-isolator, opto-coupler, photo-coupler – photodiode, BJT, JFET, SCR, TRIAC, zero-crossing TRIAC, open collector IC, CMOS IC, solid state relay (SSR)
  - Slotted optical switch, opto switch, optical switch
  - LED display – seven-segment display, sixteen-segment display, dot-matrix display

=== Display technologies ===
Current:

- Filament lamp (indicator lamp)
- Vacuum fluorescent display (VFD) (preformed characters, 7 segment, starburst)
- Cathode-ray tube (CRT) (dot matrix scan, radial scan (e.g. radar), arbitrary scan (e.g. oscilloscope)) (monochrome & colour)
- LCD (preformed characters, dot matrix) (passive, TFT) (monochrome, colour)
- Neon (individual, 7 segment display)
- LED (individual, 7 segment display, starburst display, dot matrix)
- Split-flap display (numeric, preprinted messages)
- Plasma display (dot matrix)
- OLED (similar to an LCD, but each pixel generates its own light, can be made flexible or transparent)
- Micro-LED (similar to OLED, but uses inorganic LEDs instead of organic ones, does not suffer from screen burn-in, however it cannot be made flexible or transparent)

Obsolete:

- Incandescent filament 7 segment display (aka 'Numitron')
- Nixie tube
- Dekatron (aka glow transfer tube)
- Magic eye tube indicator
- Penetron (a 2 colour see-through CRT)

=== Vacuum tubes (valves) ===
A vacuum tube is based on current conduction through a vacuum (see Vacuum tube).

- Diode or rectifier tube
- Amplification
  - Triode
  - Tetrode
  - Pentode
  - Hexode
  - Pentagrid (Heptode)
  - Octode
  - Traveling-wave tube
  - Klystron
- Oscillation
  - Magnetron
  - Reflex klystron (obsolete)
  - Carcinotron

Optical detectors or emitters

- Phototube or photodiode – tube equivalent of semiconductor photodiode
- Photomultiplier tube – phototube with internal gain
- Cathode-ray tube (CRT) or television picture tube (obsolete)
- Vacuum fluorescent display (VFD) – modern non-raster sort of small CRT display
- Magic eye tube – small CRT display used as a tuning meter (obsolete)
- X-ray tube – generates x-rays

=== Discharge devices ===
- Gas discharge tube
- Ignitron
- Thyratron

Obsolete:

- Mercury arc rectifier
- Voltage regulator tube
- Nixie tube

=== Power sources ===
Sources of electrical power:

- Battery – acid- or alkali-based power supply.
- Fuel cell – an electrochemical generator
- Power supply – usually a main hook-up
- Photovoltaic device – generates electricity from light
- Thermoelectric generator – generates electricity from temperature gradients
- Electrical generator – an electromechanical power source
- Piezoelectric generator - generates electricity from mechanical strain
- Van de Graaff generator - generates electricity from friction

== Passive components ==
Components incapable of controlling current by means of another electrical signal are called passive devices. Resistors, capacitors, inductors, and transformers are all considered passive devices.

=== Resistors ===
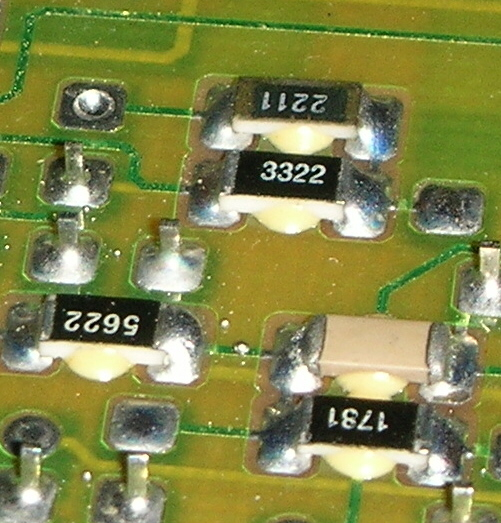
Surface-mount resistors on the backside of a PCB

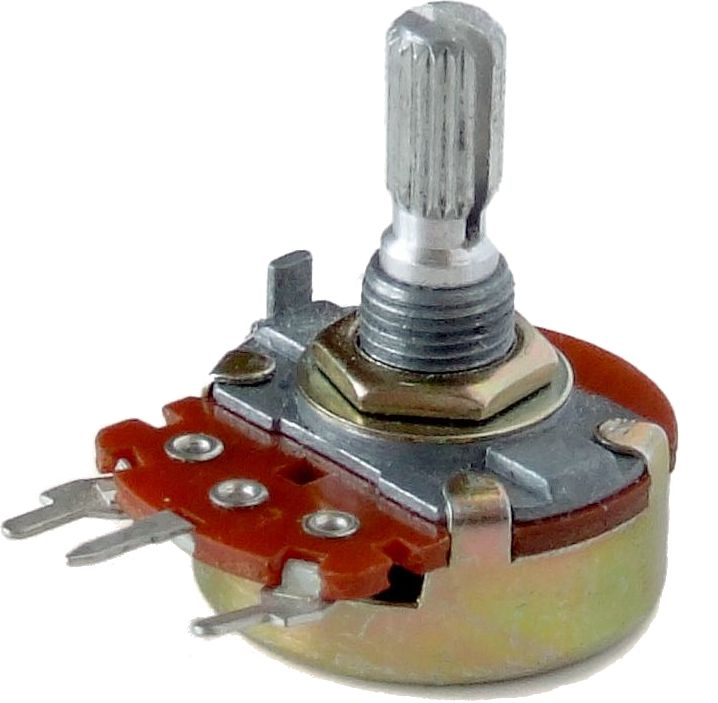
A potentiometer, a variable resistor

Pass current in proportion to voltage (Ohm's law) and oppose current.

- Resistor – fixed value
  - Power resistor – larger to safely dissipate heat generated
  - SIP or DIP resistor network – array of resistors in one package
- Variable resistor
  - Rheostat – two-terminal variable resistor (often for high power)
  - Potentiometer – three-terminal variable resistor (variable voltage divider)
  - Trim pot – small potentiometer, usually for internal adjustments
  - Thermistor – thermally sensitive resistor whose prime function is to exhibit a large, predictable and precise change in electrical resistance when subjected to a corresponding change in body temperature.
  - Humistor – humidity-varied resistor
  - Photoresistor
  - Varistor, Voltage-dependent resistor, MOV – Passes current when excessive voltage is present
- Resistance wire, Nichrome wire – wire of high-resistance material, often used as a heating element
- Heater – heating element

=== Capacitors ===
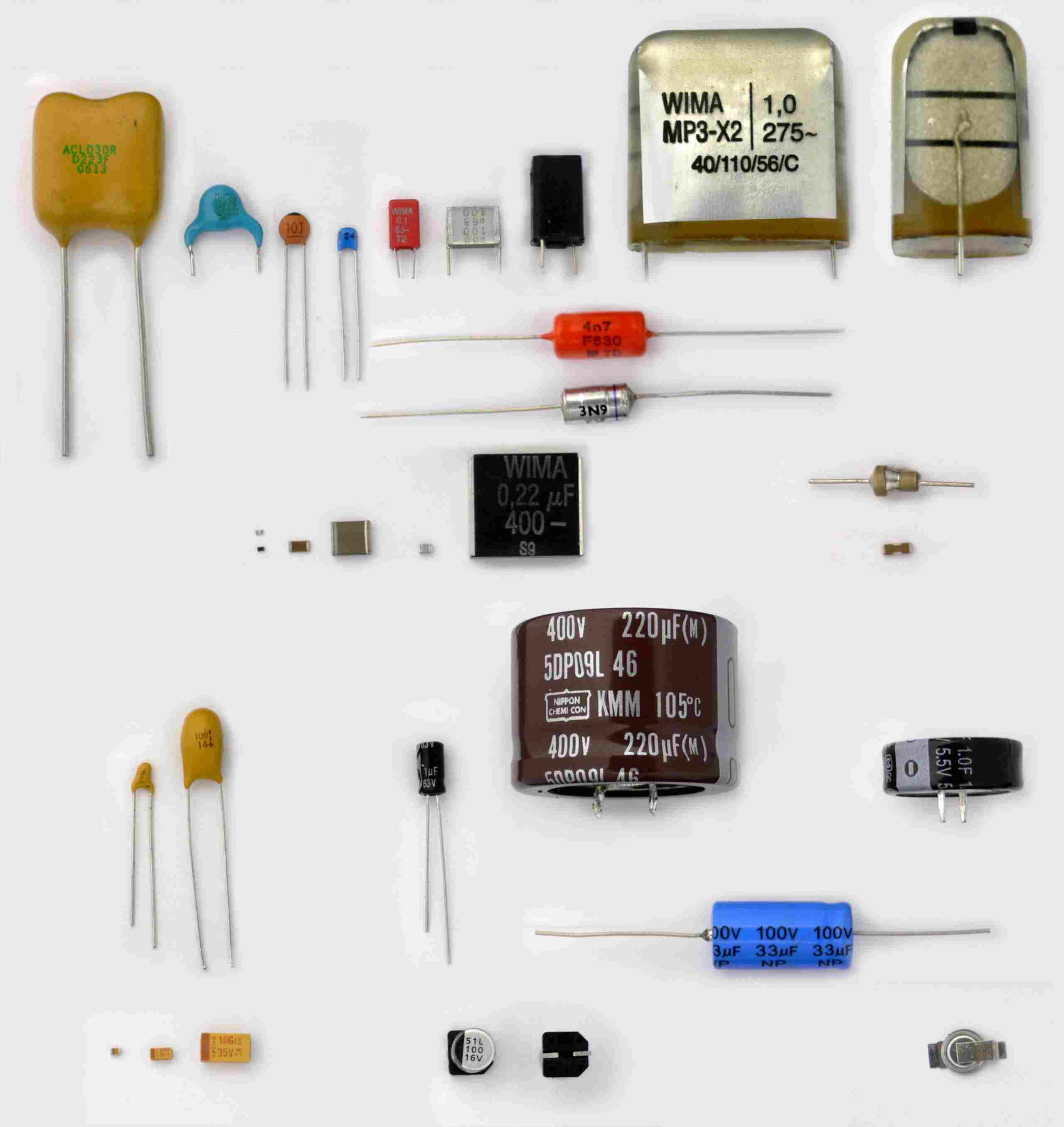
Some different capacitors for electronic equipment

Capacitors store and release electrical charge. They are used for filtering power supply lines, tuning resonant circuits, and for blocking DC voltages while passing AC signals, among numerous other uses.

- Capacitor
  - Integrated capacitors
    - MIS capacitor
    - Trench capacitor
  - Fixed capacitors
    - Ceramic capacitor
    - Film capacitor
    - Electrolytic capacitor
      - Aluminum electrolytic capacitor
      - Tantalum electrolytic capacitor
      - Niobium electrolytic capacitor (Columbium capacitor)
      - Polymer capacitor, OS-CON
    - Supercapacitor (Electric double-layer capacitor)
      - Nanoionic supercapacitor
      - Lithium-ion capacitor
    - Mica capacitor
    - Vacuum capacitor
  - Variable capacitor – adjustable capacitance
    - Tuning capacitor – variable capacitor for tuning a radio, oscillator, or tuned circuit
    - Trimmer capacitor – small variable capacitor for seldom or rare adjustments of LC-circuits
    - Vacuum variable capacitor
  - Capacitors for special applications
    - Power capacitor
    - Safety capacitor
    - Filter capacitor
    - Light-emitting capacitor (LEC)
    - Motor capacitor
    - Photoflash capacitor
    - Reservoir capacitor / Bulk capacitor
    - Coupling capacitor
    - Decoupling capacitor / Buffer capacitor
    - Bypass capacitor
    - Pull capacitor / Padding capacitor
    - Backup capacitor
    - Switched capacitor
    - Feedthrough capacitor
  - Capacitor network (array)
- Varicap diode – AC capacitance varies according to the DC voltage applied

=== Integrated passive devices ===
Integrated passive devices are passive devices integrated within one distinct package. They take up less space than equivalent combinations of discrete components.

=== Magnetic (inductive) devices ===
Electrical components that use magnetism in the storage and release of electrical charge through current:

- Inductor, coil, choke
- Variable inductor
- Saturable inductor
- Transformer
- Magnetic amplifier (toroid)
- ferrite impedances, beads
- Motor / Generator
- Solenoid
- Loudspeaker and microphone

=== Memristor ===
Electrical components that pass charge in proportion to magnetism or magnetic flux, and have the ability to retain a previous resistive state, hence the name of Memory plus Resistor.

- Memristor

=== Networks ===
Components that use more than one type of passive component:

- RC network – forms an RC circuit, used in snubbers
- LC Network – forms an LC circuit, used in tunable transformers and RFI filters.

=== Transducers, sensors, detectors ===
1. Transducers generate physical effects when driven by an electrical signal, or vice versa.
2. Sensors (detectors) are transducers that react to environmental conditions by changing their electrical properties or generating an electrical signal.
3. The transducers listed here are single electronic components (as opposed to complete assemblies), and are passive (see Semiconductors and Tubes for active ones). Only the most common ones are listed here.
- Audio
  - Loudspeaker – Electromagnetic or piezoelectric device to generate full audio
  - Buzzer – Electromagnetic or piezoelectric sounder to generate tones
- Position, motion
  - Linear variable differential transformer (LVDT) – Magnetic – detects linear position
  - Rotary encoder, Shaft Encoder – Optical, magnetic, resistive or switches – detects absolute or relative angle or rotational speed
  - Inclinometer – Capacitive – detects angle with respect to gravity
  - Motion sensor, Vibration sensor
  - Flow meter – detects flow in liquid or gas
- Force, torque
  - Strain gauge – Piezoelectric or resistive – detects squeezing, stretching, twisting
  - Accelerometer – Piezoelectric – detects acceleration, gravity
- Thermal
  - Thermocouple, thermopile – Wires that generate a voltage proportional to delta temperature
  - Thermistor – Resistor whose resistance changes with temperature, up PTC or down NTC
  - Resistance Temperature Detector (RTD) – Wire whose resistance changes with temperature
  - Bolometer – Device for measuring the power of incident electromagnetic radiation
  - Thermal cutoff – Switch that is opened or closed when a set temperature is exceeded
- Magnetic field (see also Hall Effect in semiconductors)
  - Magnetometer, Gauss meter
- Humidity
  - Hygrometer
- Electromagnetic, light
  - Photo resistor – Light dependent resistor (LDR)

=== Antennas ===
Antennas transmit or receive radio waves

- Elemental dipole
- Yagi
- Phased array
- Loop antenna
- Parabolic dish
- Log-periodic dipole array
- Biconical
- Feedhorn

=== Assemblies, modules ===
Multiple electronic components assembled in a device that is in itself used as a component

- Oscillator
- Display devices
  - Liquid crystal display (LCD)
  - Digital voltmeters
- Filter

=== Prototyping aids ===
- Wire-wrap
- Breadboard

== Electromechanical devices ==
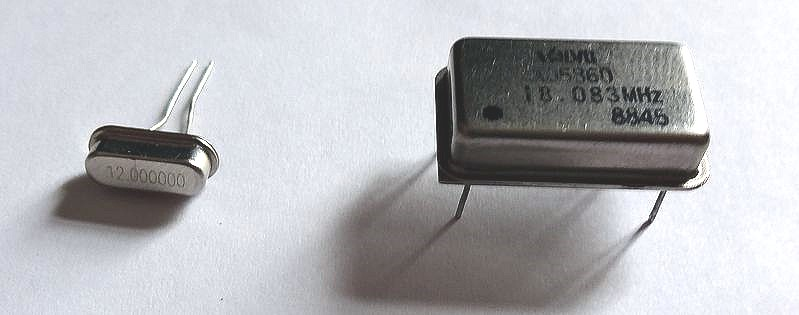
A quartz crystal (left) and a crystal oscillator

=== Piezoelectric devices, crystals, resonators ===
Passive components that use piezoelectric effect:

- Components that use the effect to generate or filter high frequencies
  - Crystal – a ceramic crystal used to generate precise frequencies (See the Modules class below for complete oscillators)
  - Ceramic resonator – Is a ceramic crystal used to generate semi-precise frequencies
  - Ceramic filter – Is a ceramic crystal used to filter a band of frequencies such as in radio receivers
  - surface acoustic wave (SAW) filters
- Components that use the effect as mechanical transducers.
  - Ultrasonic motor – Electric motor that uses the piezoelectric effects
  - For piezo buzzers and microphones, see the Transducer class below

=== Microelectromechanical systems ===
- Microelectromechanical systems
  - Accelerometer
  - Digital micromirror device

=== Terminals and connectors ===
Devices to make electrical connection

- Terminal
- Connector
  - Socket
  - Screw terminal, Terminal Blocks
  - Pin header

=== Cable assemblies ===
Electrical cables with connectors or terminals at their ends

- Power cord
- Patch cord
- Test lead

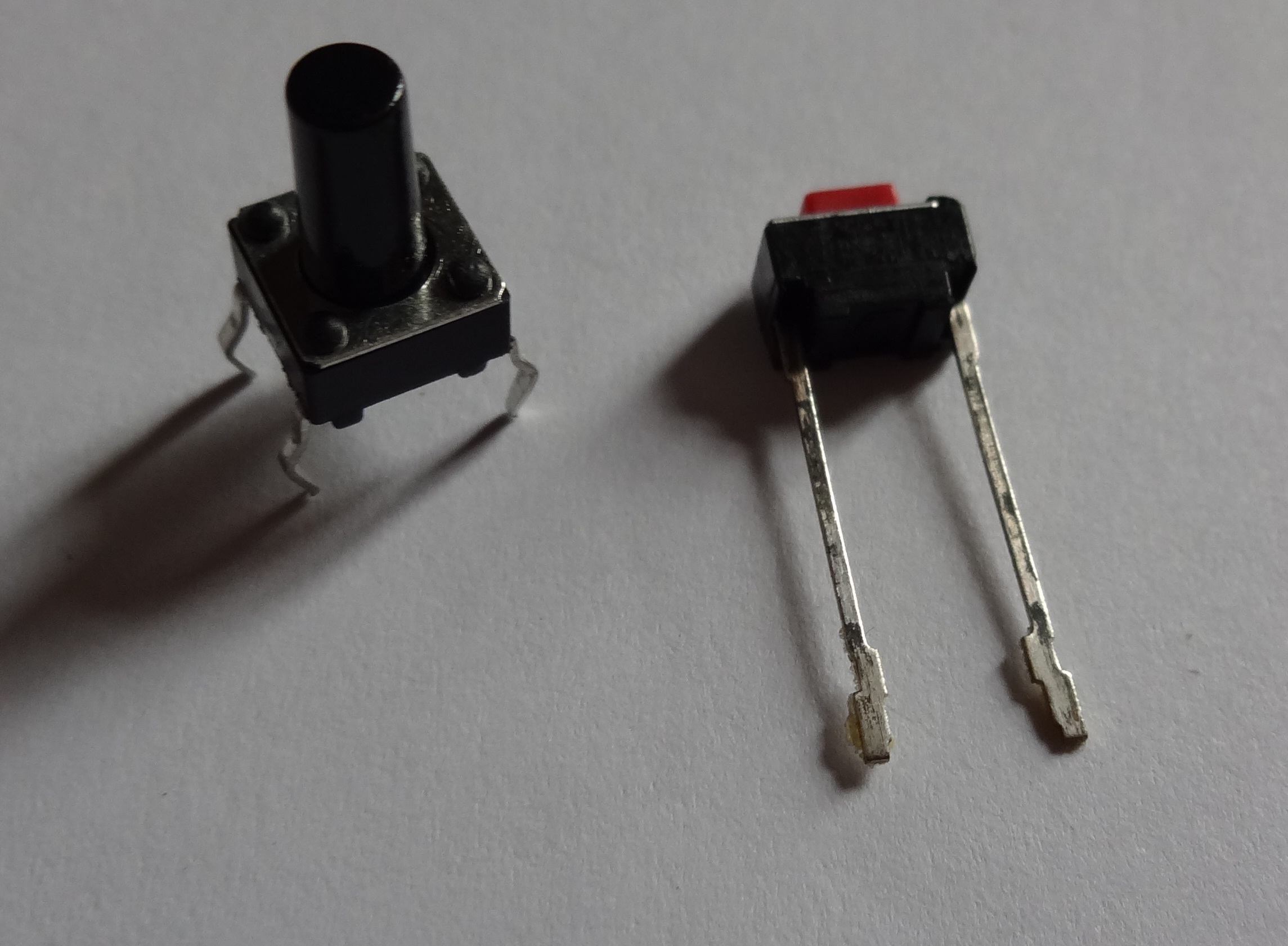
2 different miniature pushbutton switches

=== Switches ===
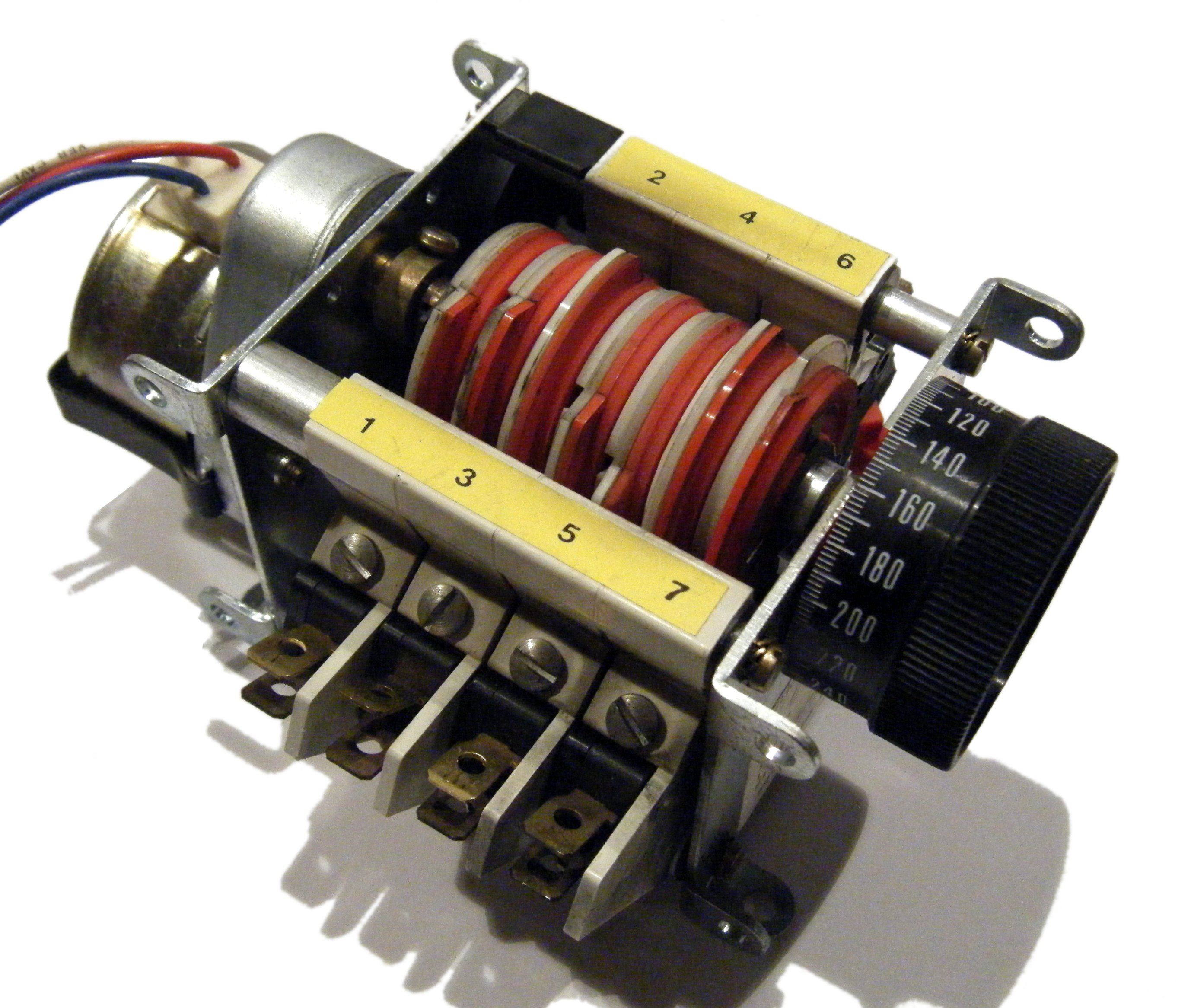
A 7 cam 7 contact cam timer

Components that can pass current ("closed") or break the current ("open"):

- Switch – Manually operated switch
  - Electrical description: SPST, SPDT, DPST, DPDT, NPNT (general)
  - Technology: slide switches, toggle switches, rocker switches, rotary switches, pushbutton switches
- Cam timer (Drum sequencer) – Electromechanical system for controlling a sequence of events
- Keypad – Array of pushbutton switches
- DIP switch – Small array of switches for internal configuration settings
- Footswitch – Foot-operated switch
- Knife switch – Switch with unenclosed conductors
- Micro switch – Mechanically activated switch with snap action
- Limit switch – Mechanically activated switch to sense limit of motion
- Mercury switch – Switch sensing tilt
- Centrifugal switch – Switch sensing centrifugal force due to rate of rotation
- Relay or contactor – Electro-mechanically operated switch (see also solid state relay above)
- Reed switch – Magnetically activated switch
- Thermostat – Thermally activated switch
- Humidistat – Humidity activated switch
- Circuit breaker – Switch opened in response to excessive current: a resettable fuse
- Disconnector – Switch used in high- and medium-voltage applications for maintenance of other devices or isolation of circuits
- Transfer switch – Switch that toggles a load between two sources

=== Protection devices ===
Passive components that protect circuits from excessive currents or voltages:

- Fuse – over-current protection, one time use
- Circuit breaker – resettable fuse in the form of a mechanical switch
- Resettable fuse or PolySwitch – circuit breaker action using solid state device
- Ground-fault protection or residual-current device – circuit breaker sensitive to mains currents passing to ground
- Metal oxide varistor (MOV), surge absorber, TVS – Over-voltage protection
- Inrush current limiter – protection against initial Inrush current
- Gas discharge tube – protection against high voltage surges
- Spark gap – electrodes with a gap to arc over at a high voltage
- Lightning arrester – spark gap used to protect against lightning strikes
- Recloser – automatic switch that opens on an overcurrent (fault) condition, then closes to check if the fault is cleared, and repeats this process a specified number of times before maintaining the open position until it is manually closed
- Arc-fault circuit interrupter – circuit breaker that protects against arcs
- Network protector – protective device that disconnects a distribution transformer when energy flow reverses direction
- Magnetic starter – electromechanical switch used in motors

=== Mechanical accessories ===
- Enclosure (electrical)
- Heat sink
- Fan

=== Other ===
- Printed circuit boards
- Lamp
- Waveguide

=== Obsolete ===
- Carbon amplifier (see Carbon microphones used as amplifiers)
- Carbon arc (negative resistance device)
- Dynamo (historic rf generator)
- Coherer

== Standard symbols ==
On a circuit diagram, electronic devices are represented by conventional symbols. Reference designators are applied to the symbols to identify the components.

== See also ==
- Circuit design
- Circuit diagram
- Operational amplifier
- 7400-series integrated circuits
- E-series of preferred numbers
- Lumped element model
- Counterfeit electronic components
- Electrical element
- Electronic mixer
- Electronic components' datasheets
- History of electronic engineering
- IEEE 315-1975
- Solid-state electronics
