= Slotted optical switch =

A diagram of a mechanical computer mouse showing two slotted optical switches

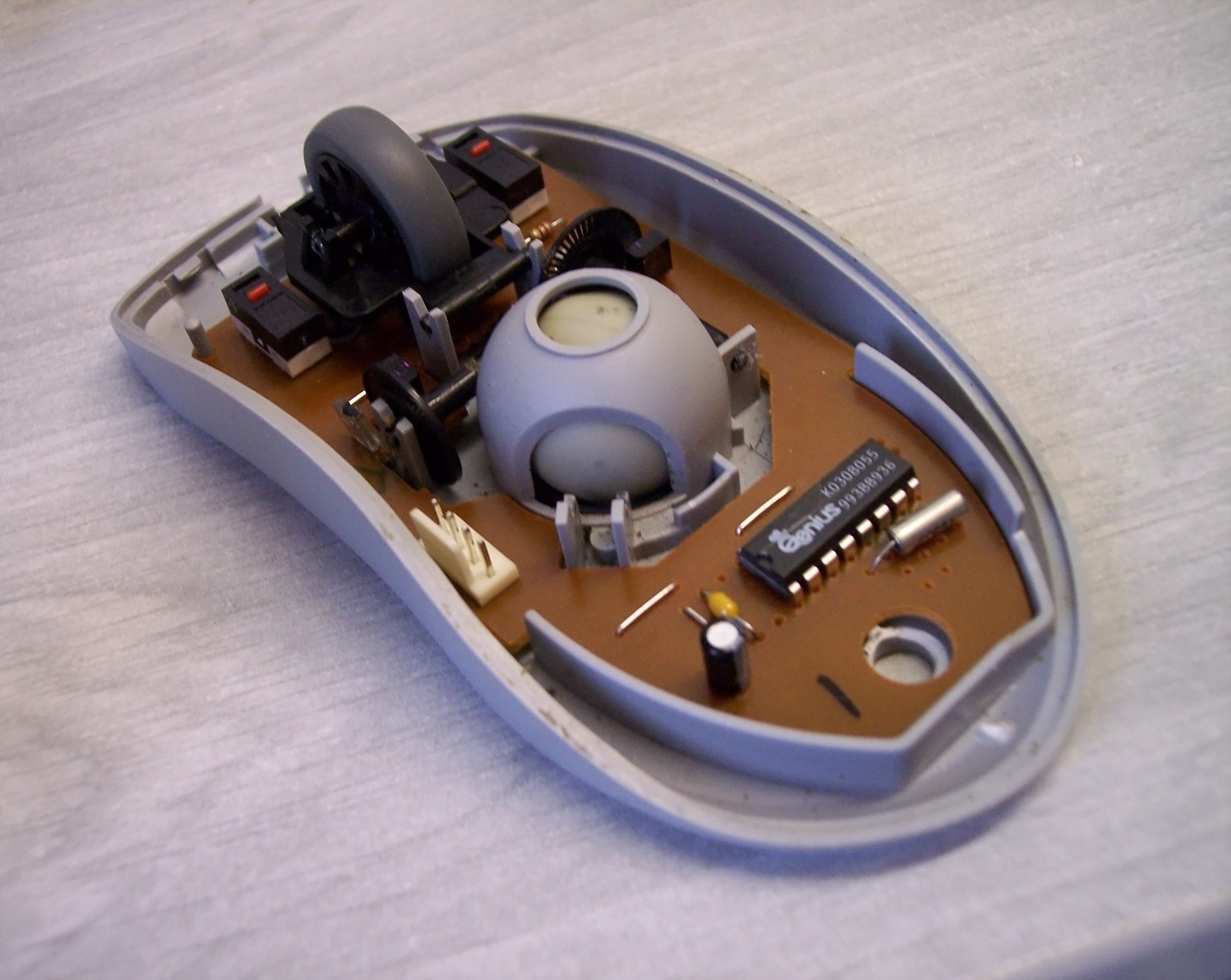
a photo of a mechanical computer mouse showing two slotted optical switches

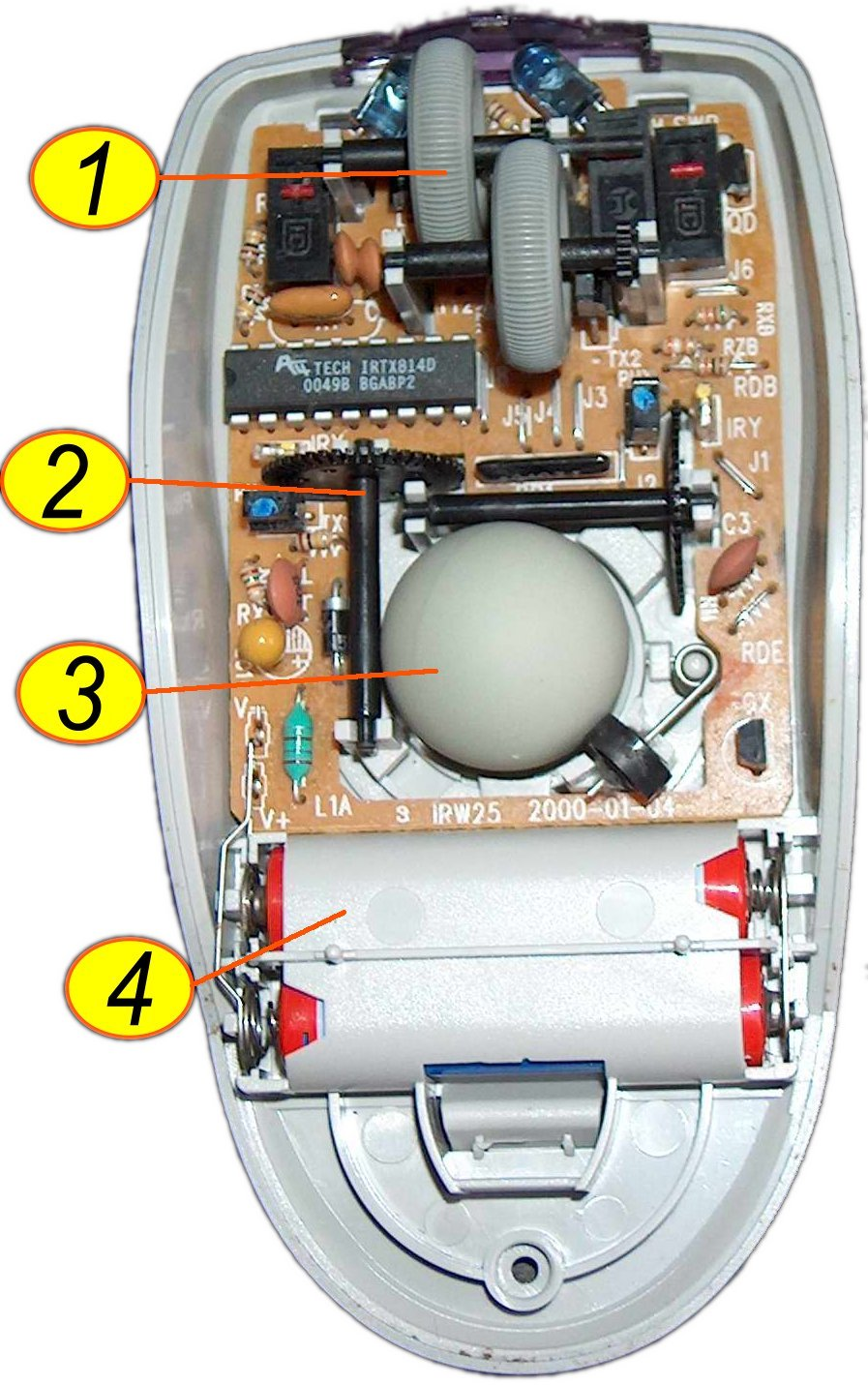
a photo of a mechanical computer mouse showing two slotted optical switches

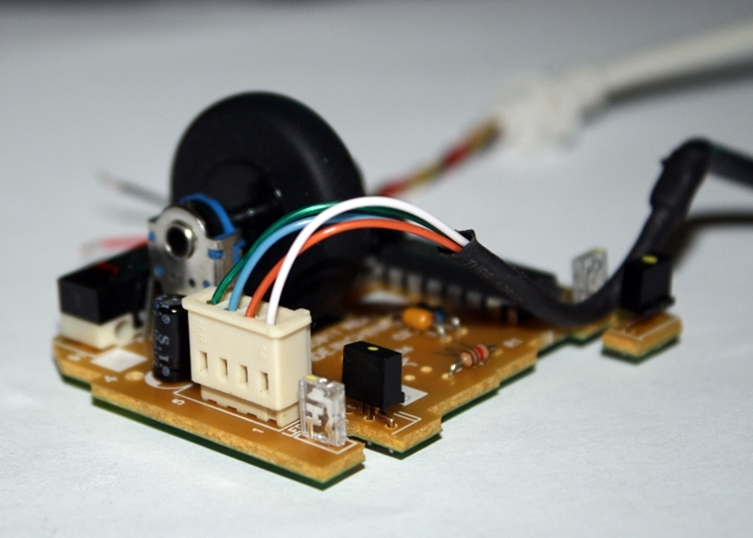
close-up of a mouse PCB showing a slotted optical switch assembled from discrete LED and photodetector

The slotted optical switch, sometimes known as opto switch or optical switch but not to be confused with the optical component, is a device comprising a photoemitter (e.g. LED) and a photodetector (e.g. photodiode) mounted in a single package so that the photoemitter normally illuminates the photodetector, but an opaque object can be inserted in a slot between them so as to break the beam. Associated circuitry is provided which changes state when the beam is interrupted. For example, the carriage of a computer printer may be fitted with a projection which interrupts the beam of a slotted switch when it reaches the end of its travel, causing circuitry to react appropriately. Another application of the slotted switch is in the type of computer mouse with a rotating ball. The ball measures distances moved by rotating orthogonal shafts which drive optical chopper wheels turning in the slots of slotted switches.

This device uses the same basic components as an opto-coupler, but is operated by manipulating the light path instead of the photoemitter input.

Illustrations and data on slotted optical switches are to be found in catalogues and manufacturers' data sheets.
