= Leopoldo B. Valdes =

Pioneer in semiconductors

Leopoldo Benjamin Valdes
- Known for: Semiconductor pioneer
- Scientific career
- Fields: Physics electrical engineering
- Institutions: Shockley Semiconductor Laboratory; Bell Labs; Pacific Semiconductors; Rheem Manufacturing Company; Watkins-Johnson Company

Leopoldo Benjamin Valdes was a pioneer in semiconductors. He was one of the first four recruits by William Shockley to help develop technologies at Shockley Semiconductor Laboratory.

== Career ==
During the winter of 1954–1955, William Shockley decided to seek a sponsor to help him establish production of complex transistors and his own Shockley diodes. He was initially supported by Raytheon, but the agreement was soon canceled by that company. After Shockley subsequently established Shockley Semiconductor Laboratory under the umbrella of Beckman Instruments, he recruited William W. Happ who he knew from Raytheon. Shockley's other three initial recruits were George Smoot Horsley and Valdes both of whom he knew from Bell Labs, and Richard Victor Jones, who was then a new Berkeley graduate.

Valdes, as the most experienced of the group, was tasked with setting up crystal growing equipment. He also brought lists of equipment suppliers from his prior employer, Pacific Semiconductors. Valdes, however, clashed with Shockley early on because, according to Jones, he felt he knew more than Shockley about semiconductors; he ultimately left the company after about a year. Jones also recalled that Valdes was under a great deal of pressure because he had moved his family west to join Shockley and took issue with the way Shockley was running the company. Jones also believed Shockley, who would soon become notorious for his paranoia and secrecy at the company, viewed the experienced Valdes as a competitor and suspected he would take Shockley's technologies to another company.

Valdes later worked for Rheem Manufacturing Company, and then Watkins-Johnson Company.

In 1961, Valdes published a 370-page book The Physical Theory of Transistors which is cited in university level textbooks.
