= Emitter turn off thyristor =

The Emitter Turn Off Thyristor (ETO) is a type of thyristor that uses a MOSFET to turn on and turn off. It combines the advantages of both the GTO and MOSFET. It has two gates - one normal gate for turn on and one with a series MOSFET for turn off.

== History ==
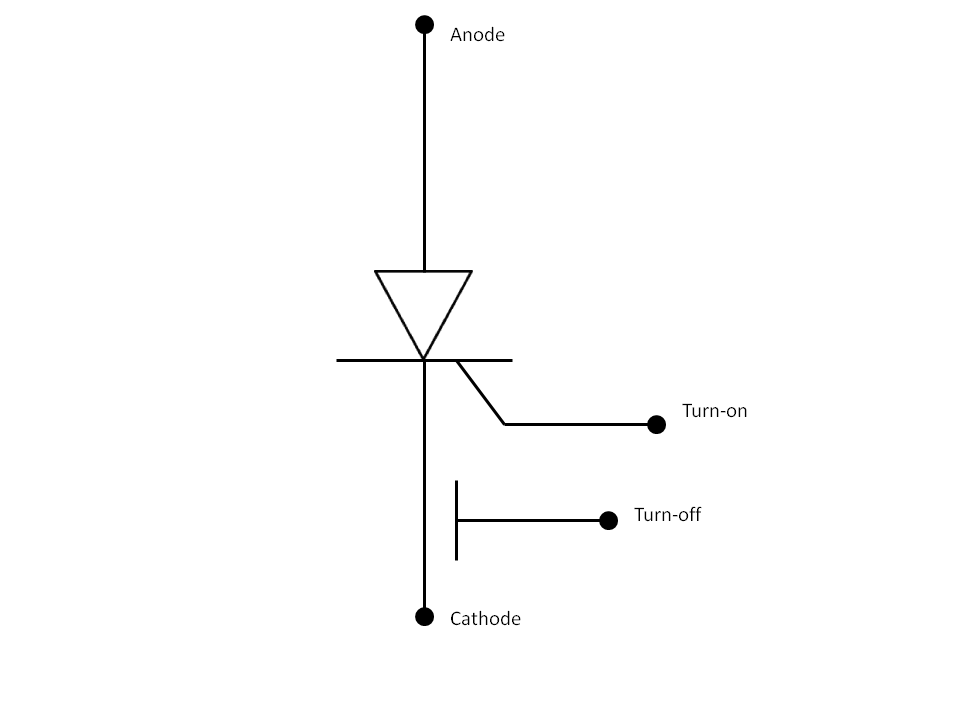
Circuit Symbol of an ETO

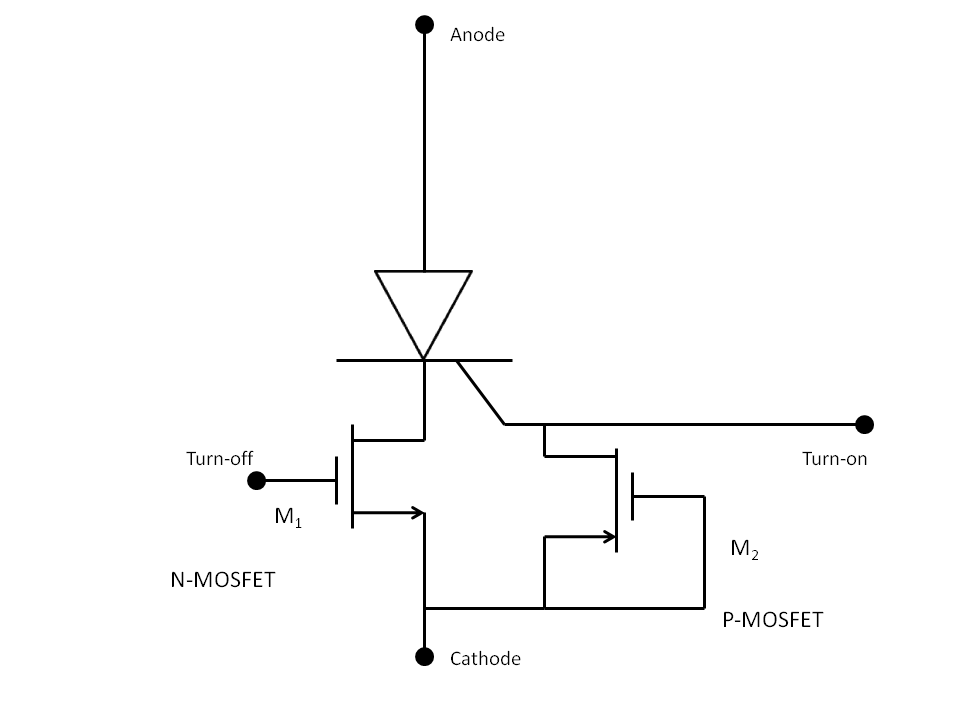
Equivalent Circuit of an ETO

The first generation ETO was developed by Prof. Alex Q. Huang in the Center for Power Electronics, Virginia Tech, in 1996. Although the ETO concept was demonstrated, the first-generation ETO had limitations that prevented high-power applications. The device rating was later improved to 4500V/4000A.

== Device Description ==
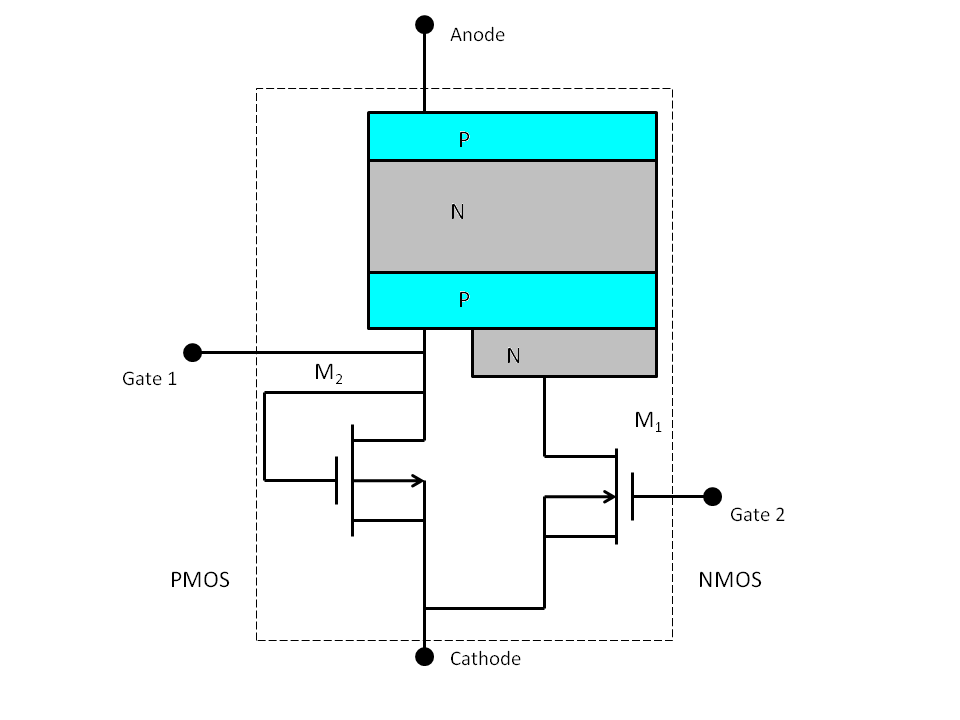
PN structure of an emitter turn off thyristor

=== Turn On ===
An ETO is turned ON by applying positive voltages to both gates, gate 1 and gate 2. When a positive voltage is applied to gate 2, it turns on the MOSFET that is connected in series with the cathode terminal of the PNPN thyristor structure. The positive voltage applied to gate 1 turns off the MOSFET connected to the gate terminal of the thyristor.

=== Turn Off ===
When a turn-off negative voltage signal is applied to the MOSFET connected to the cathode, it turns off and transfers all the current away from the cathode (N-emitter of the NPN transistor in the thyristor) into the base gate via MOSFET connected to the gate of the thyristor. This stops the regenerative latching process and results in a fast turn-off. Both the MOSFET connected to the cathode and MOSFET connected to the gate of the thyristor is not subjected to high-voltage stresses irrespective of the magnitude of the voltage on the ETO, due to the internal structure of the thyristor containing a P-N junction. The drawback of connecting a MOSFET in series is that it has to carry the main thyristor current, and it also increases the total voltage drop by about 0.3 to 0.5V and its corresponding losses. Similar to a GTO, the ETO has a long turn-off tail of current at the end of the turn-off and the next turn-on must wait until the residual charge on the anode side is dissipated through the recombination process.

== See also ==
- Thyristor
- MOSFET
- Gate turn-off thyristor
