= William W. Happ =

Polish-American electrical engineer (1919–1998)

William Wolfgang Happ
- Born: August 2, 1919; Inowrocław, Poland
- Died: December 19, 1998 (aged 79)
- Education: McGill University (B.S.); Massachusetts Institute of Technology (M.S.); Boston University (PhD)
- Known for: Semiconductor pioneer
- Scientific career
- Fields: Physics; Electrical engineering
- Workplaces: Raytheon Company; Sylvania Electric Products; Shockley Semiconductor Laboratory; Lockheed Corporation; NASA; Arizona State University

William Wolfgang Happ (August 2, 1919 – December 19, 1998) was a Polish physicist, electrical engineer, and pioneer in semiconductors. He was one of the first four recruits by William Shockley to help develop technologies at Shockley Semiconductor Laboratory.

== Early life ==
William Happ was born in 1919 in a town on the border of Poland and Germany. While still a boy, his father, a German-Jewish lawyer, was disbarred by the Nazi regime. The family attempted to emigrate to the United States but were unsuccessful. William was then sent to live in Italy (ten years later, his family was sent to Auschwitz where they perished). Upon graduating from school in 1938, he purchased a fake passport which allowed him to travel to London, where he began studying engineering. At the outbreak of World War II, Happ attempted to enlist in the British Army, however the draft board told him to remain in school. Two days before he would take his final exams, the British government arrested and imprisoned him, believing his connections to Germany and Italy suspicious. After two months, he was sent to Canada with a large number of others for Canada to use as a bargaining chip in the return of their own POWs in Europe; Britain only had 500 German POWs, so their numbers were augmented with many like Happ- people as young as 14 or as old as 70, many of them Jews, most virulent anti-Nazis, being held under various unproven suspicions. Shortly after arrival the Canadians discovered they were not German POWs, useless in their prisoner exchange plan, and began mistreating them. On one occasion, Happ was beaten so severely he lost a kidney. However, Happ worked to prove his loyalty to his new country and was eventually allowed to join the Canadian Army. After the war's conclusion, he attended McGill University, and thereafter emigrated to the US, where he completed his master's degree at Massachusetts Institute of Technology and his PhD at Boston University.

== Career ==
During the winter of 1954–1955, William Shockley decided to seek a sponsor to help him establish production of complex transistors and his own Shockley diodes. He initially found this sponsor in Raytheon, however the company soon canceled the project. After Shockley subsequently established his lab under the umbrella of Beckman Instruments, he recruited Happ from Raytheon where he had previously worked on semiconductor devices. In addition to Happ, Shockley's other three initial recruits were George Smoot Horsley and Leopoldo B. Valdes from Bell Labs, and Richard Victor Jones who had just graduated from Berkeley.

Happ worked for Shockley from 1955 to 1958, where he assisted in developing silicon transistors; Happ also provided ordering specs from prior employers, which helped the team purchase necessary supplies. He was also responsible for convincing Shockley to hire Robert Noyce and Gordon Moore, two of the men who would become known as the traitorous eight- a group who left Shockley to join Fairchild Semiconductor and would eventually go on to found Intel. After leaving Shockley Labs in 1958, Happ worked for Lockheed's missile and space division where he led a team developing solar power sources for satellites, until he moved on to NASA in 1966. In 1970, he transferred again to the Army Corps of Engineers construction research laboratory.

Happ was a professor at Arizona State University where he taught electrical engineering, specifically systems modelling and design and computer aided design, and also a visiting professor at the University of Buenos Aires and University of Illinois.

During the 1990's Dr. Happ worked as a civil servant for the Air Force Research Laboratory's Science and Technology Directorate (AFRL/ST). He provided invaluable support to USAF's Independent Research & Development Program (IR&D) integrating advanced industry research into future USAF systems.
