= George Smoot Horsley =

American physicist (1916–1992)

- Born: May 30, 1916
- Died: June 13, 1992 (aged 76)
- Education: University of Utah (PhD)
- Known for: Semiconductor and printed circuitry pioneer
- Scientific career
- Fields: Physics
- Workplaces: Bell Labs; Motorola; Shockley Semiconductor Laboratory

First Lieutenant George Smoot Horsley
- Burial place: Tacoma, Washington
- Military career
- Allegiance: United States of America
- Branch: United States Army Air Corps
- Service years: 1942-1945
- Rank: First Lieutenant
- Awards: Air Medal, Five oak leaf clusters

George Smoot Horsley (May 30, 1916 – June 13, 1992) was a physicist and pioneer in printed circuitry and semiconductors. He was one of the first four recruits by William Shockley to help develop technologies at Shockley Semiconductor Laboratory.

== Early life ==
Horsley was born in 1916 in Brigham City, Utah to Mormon parents Golden and Mary Horsley. He served in the US Army Air Corps during World War II, originally commissioned a Second Lieutenant in 1942 and assigned to field artillery. He attained the rank of First Lieutenant and earned his Aviator Badge to become a pilot in October 1943. He had served as a missionary and in 1945 was named an acting Chaplain aboard a ship bound for North Africa. He served in Africa and Italy. In 1945, near the close of the war, he began taking a course in Algebra with the Armed Forces Institute.

After his military service had ended, he enrolled at the University of Utah, where his grades were sufficient to admit him into Phi Beta Kappa. He obtained his PhD in physics from University of Utah in 1954.

== Career ==
During the winter of 1954–1955, William Shockley decided to seek a sponsor to help him establish production of complex transistors and his own Shockley diodes. He was initially supported by Raytheon, but the agreement was soon canceled by that company. After Shockley subsequently established Shockley Semiconductor Laboratory under the umbrella of Beckman Instruments, he recruited four men: William W. Happ who he knew from Raytheon, Horsley and Leopoldo B. Valdes both of whom he knew from Bell Labs, and Richard Victor Jones, a new Berkeley graduate. Horsley had also previously worked at Motorola.

Horsley's name appears on Shockley patents originally from 1959 but re-dated 1964 after Shockley Labs had been sold to Clevite.
