= Thyristor =

Type of solid-state switch

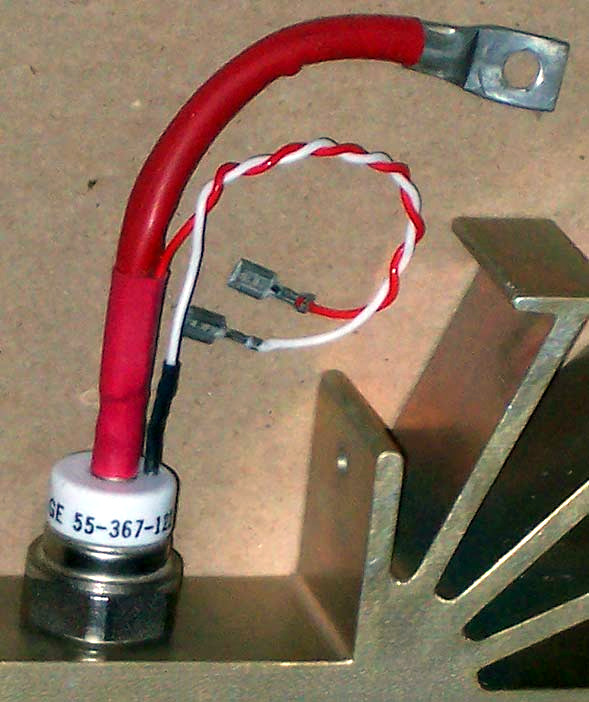
- Thyristor
- Component type: Active
- First produced: 1956
- Pin names: anode, gate and cathode

Electronic symbol

A thyristor (/θaɪˈrɪstər/, from a combination of Greek language θύρα, meaning "door" or "valve", and transistor) is a solid-state semiconductor device which can be thought of as a highly robust and switchable diode, allowing the passage of current in one direction but not the other, often under control of a gate electrode, that is used in high-power applications like inverters and radar generators. It usually consists of four layers of alternating P- and N-type materials. It acts as a bistable switch (or a latch). There are two designs, differing in what triggers the conducting state. In a three-lead thyristor, a small current on its gate lead controls the larger current of the anode-to-cathode path. In a two-lead thyristor, conduction begins when the potential difference between the anode and cathode themselves is sufficiently large (breakdown voltage). The thyristor continues conducting until the voltage across the device is reverse-biased or the voltage is removed (by some other means), or through the control-gate signal on newer types.

Some sources define "silicon-controlled rectifier" (SCR) and "thyristor" as synonymous. Other sources define thyristors as more complex devices that incorporate at least four layers of alternating N-type and P-type substrate.

The first thyristor devices were released commercially in 1956. Because thyristors can control a relatively large amount of power and voltage with a small device, they find wide application in control of electric power, ranging from light dimmers and electric motor speed control to high-voltage direct-current power transmission. Thyristors may be used in power-switching circuits, relay-replacement circuits, inverter circuits, oscillator circuits, level-detector circuits, chopper circuits, light-dimming circuits, low-cost timer circuits, logic circuits, speed-control circuits, phase-control circuits, etc. Originally, thyristors relied only on current reversal to turn them off, making them difficult to apply to direct current; newer device types can be turned on and off through the control-gate signal. The latter is known as a gate turn-off thyristor, or GTO thyristor.

Unlike transistors, thyristors have a two-valued switching characteristic, meaning that a thyristor can only be fully on or off, while a transistor can lie in between on and off states. This makes a thyristor unsuitable as an analog amplifier, but useful as a switch.

== History ==
The silicon controlled rectifier (SCR) or thyristor proposed by William Shockley in 1950 and championed by Moll and others at Bell Labs was developed in 1956 by power engineers at General Electric (GE), led by Gordon Hall and commercialized by GE's Frank W. "Bill" Gutzwiller. The Institute of Electrical and Electronics Engineers recognized the invention by placing a plaque at the invention site in Clyde, New York, and declaring it an IEEE Historic Milestone.

In 1960, Transitron Electronic Corporation marketed an PNPN tetrode with a high current gain at the time referred to as Binistor. The device was predicted to be applied both in switching and data-storage circuits. One research paper using Transitron's tetrode demonstrated an "unusual" (at the time) switched-mode power-supply circuit.

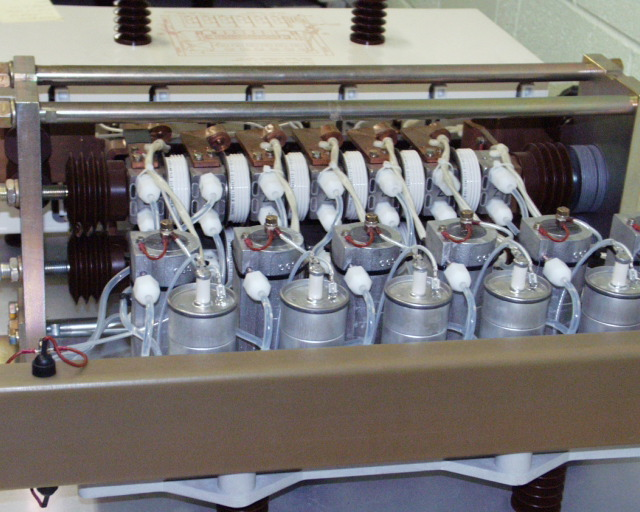
A bank of six 2000-amp thyristors (white disks arranged in a row at top, and seen edge-on)

An earlier gas-filled tube device called a thyratron provided a similar electronic switching capability, where a small control voltage could switch a large current. It is from a combination of "thyratron" and "transistor" that the term "thyristor" is derived.

In recent years, some manufacturers have developed thyristors using silicon carbide (SiC) as the semiconductor material. These have applications in high-temperature environments, being capable of operating at temperatures up to 350 °C.

== Design ==
Structure on the physical and electronic level, and the thyristor symbol

The thyristor is a four-layered, three-terminal semiconductor device, with each layer consisting of alternating N-type or P-type material, for example P-N-P-N. The main terminals, labelled anode and cathode, are across all four layers. The control terminal, called the gate, is attached to p-type material near the cathode. (A variant called an SCS—silicon-controlled switch—brings all four layers out to terminals.) The operation of a thyristor can be understood in terms of a pair of tightly coupled bipolar junction transistors, arranged to cause a self-latching action.

Thyristors have three states:

1. Reverse blocking mode: Voltage is applied in the direction that would be blocked by a diode
2. Forward blocking mode: Voltage is applied in the direction that would cause a diode to conduct, but the thyristor has not been triggered into conduction
3. Forward conducting mode: The thyristor has been triggered into conduction and will remain conducting until the forward current drops below a threshold value known as the "holding current"

=== Gate terminal ===
Layer diagram of thyristor

The thyristor has three p-n junctions (serially named J_{1}, J_{2}, J_{3} from the anode).

When the anode is at a positive potential V_{AK} with respect to the cathode with no voltage applied at the gate, junctions J_{1} and J_{3} are forward biased, while junction J_{2} is reverse biased. As J_{2} is reverse biased, no conduction takes place (Off state). Now if V_{AK} is increased beyond the breakdown voltage V_{BO} of the thyristor, avalanche breakdown of J_{2} takes place and the thyristor starts conducting (On state).

If a positive potential V_{G} is applied at the gate terminal with respect to the cathode, the breakdown of the junction J_{2} occurs at a lower value of V_{AK}. By selecting an appropriate value of V_{G}, the thyristor can be switched into the on state quickly.

Once avalanche breakdown has occurred, the thyristor continues to conduct, irrespective of the gate voltage, until the potential V_{AK} is removed or the current through the device (anode−cathode) becomes less than the holding current specified by the manufacturer. Hence V_{G} can be a voltage pulse, such as the voltage output from a UJT relaxation oscillator.

The gate pulses are characterized in terms of gate trigger voltage (V_{GT}) and gate trigger current (I_{GT}). Gate trigger current varies inversely with gate pulse width in such a way that it is evident that there is a minimum gate charge required to trigger the thyristor.

=== Switching characteristics ===
V–I characteristics

In a conventional thyristor, once it has been switched on by the gate terminal, the device remains latched in the on-state (i.e. does not need a continuous supply of gate current to remain in the on state), providing the anode current has exceeded the latching current (I_{L}). As long as the anode remains positively biased, it cannot be switched off unless the current drops below the holding current (I_{H}). In normal working conditions, the latching current is always greater than holding current. In the above figure, I_{L} has to come above the I_{H} on y-axis since I_{L}>I_{H}.

A thyristor can be switched off if the external circuit causes the anode to become negatively biased (a method known as natural, or line, commutation). In some applications this is done by switching a second thyristor to discharge a capacitor into the anode of the first thyristor. This method is called forced commutation.

Once the current through the thyristor drops below the holding current, there must be a delay before the anode can be positively biased and retain the thyristor in the off-state. This minimum delay is called the circuit commutated turn-off time (t_{Q}). Attempting to positively bias the anode within this time causes the thyristor to be self-triggered by the remaining charge carriers (holes and electrons) that have not yet recombined.

=== Frequency ===
Thyristors are designed for low-frequency applications; that is, those below 1 kHz. Frequencies higher than the domestic AC mains supply (e.g. 50 Hz or 60 Hz), require thyristors with lower values of t_{Q}. Such fast thyristors can be made by diffusing heavy metal ions such as gold or platinum, which act as charge combination centers, into the silicon. Today, fast thyristors are more usually made by electron or proton irradiation of the silicon, or by ion implantation. Irradiation is more versatile than heavy-metal doping because it permits the dosage to be adjusted in fine steps, even at quite a late stage in the processing of the silicon.

== Types ==
- ACS: AC switch: a high-commutation and overvoltage-protected TRIAC with gate buffer
- ACST: AC switch: a high-commutation and overvoltage-protected TRIAC
- AGT: anode gate thyristor: a thyristor with gate on n-type layer near to the anode
- ASCR: asymmetrical SCR
- BCT: bidirectional control thyristor: a bidirectional switching device containing two thyristor structures with separate gate contacts
- BOD: breakover diode: a gateless thyristor triggered by avalanche current
  - DIAC: bidirectional trigger device
  - Dynistor: unidirectional switching device
  - Shockley diode: unidirectional trigger and switching device
  - SIDAC: bidirectional switching device
  - Trisil, SIDACtor: bidirectional protection devices
- BRT: base resistance controlled thyristor
- ETO: emitter turn-off thyristor
- GTO: gate turn-off thyristor
  - DB-GTO: distributed-buffer gate turn-off thyristor
  - MA-GTO: modified-anode gate turn-off thyristor
- IGCT: integrated gate-commutated thyristor
- Ignitor: spark generators for fire-lighter circuits
- LASCR: light-activated SCR, or LTT: light-triggered thyristor
- LASS: light-activated semiconducting switch
- MCT: MOSFET controlled thyristor: It contains two additional FET structures for on/off control
- CSMT or MCS: MOS composite static induction thyristor
- PUT or PUJT: programmable unijunction transistor: a thyristor with gate on n-type layer near to the anode used as a functional replacement for unijunction transistor
- Quadrac: special type of thyristor which combines a DIAC and a TRIAC into a single package
- RCT: reverse conducting thyristor
- SCS: silicon-controlled switch or thyristor tetrode: A thyristor with both cathode and anode gates ‒ effectively a combination of SCR and PUT in one device
- SCR: silicon-controlled rectifier
- SITh: static induction thyristor, or FCTh: field-controlled thyristor: containing a gate structure that can shut down anode current flow
- TRIAC: triode for alternating current: a bidirectional switching device containing two thyristor structures with common gate contact

=== Reverse-conducting thyristor ===
A reverse-conducting thyristor (RCT) has an integrated reverse diode, so is not capable of reverse blocking. These devices are advantageous where a reverse or freewheel diode must be used. Because the SCR and diode never conduct at the same time, they do not produce heat simultaneously and can easily be integrated and cooled together. Reverse-conducting thyristors are often used in frequency changers and inverters.

=== Photothyristors ===
Electronic symbol for light-activated SCR (LASCR)

Photothyristors are activated by light. The advantage of photothyristors is their insensitivity to electrical signals, which can cause faulty operation in electrically noisy environments. A light-triggered thyristor (LTT) has an optically sensitive region in its gate, into which electromagnetic radiation (usually infrared) is coupled by an optical fiber. Since no electronic boards need to be provided at the potential of the thyristor in order to trigger it, light-triggered thyristors can be an advantage in high-voltage applications such as HVDC. Light-triggered thyristors are available with in-built over-voltage (VBO) protection, which triggers the thyristor when the forward voltage across it becomes too high; they have also been made with in-built forward recovery protection, but not commercially. Despite the simplification they can bring to the electronics of an HVDC valve, light-triggered thyristors may still require some simple monitoring electronics and are only available from a few manufacturers.

Two common photothyristors include the light-activated SCR (LASCR) and the light-activated TRIAC. A LASCR acts as a switch that turns on when exposed to light. Following light exposure, when light is absent, if the power is not removed and the polarities of the cathode and anode have not yet reversed, the LASCR is still in the "on" state. A light-activated TRIAC resembles a LASCR, except that it is designed for alternating currents.

== Failure modes ==
Thyristor manufacturers generally specify a region of safe firing, defining acceptable levels of voltage and current for a given operating temperature. The boundary of this region is partly determined by the requirement that the maximum permissible gate power (P_{G}), specified for a given trigger pulse duration, is not exceeded.

As well as the usual failure modes due to exceeding voltage, current, or power ratings, thyristors have their own particular modes of failure, including:

- Turn-on di/dt: in which the rate of rise of on-state current after triggering is higher than can be supported by the spreading speed of the active conduction area (SCRs & TRIACs).
- Forced commutation: in which the transient peak reverse recovery current causes such a high voltage drop in the sub-cathode region that it exceeds the reverse breakdown voltage of the gate cathode diode junction (SCRs only).
- Switch on dv/dt: the thyristor can be spuriously fired without trigger from the gate if the anode-to-cathode voltage rise-rate is too great.

== Applications ==
Waveforms in a rectified multiple-thyristor circuit controlling an alternating current. Red trace: load (output) voltage Blue trace: trigger voltage

Thyristors are mainly used where high currents and voltages are involved, and are often used to control alternating currents, where the change of polarity of the current causes the device to switch off automatically, referred to as "zero cross" operation. The device can be said to operate synchronously; that is, once the device is triggered, it conducts current in phase with the voltage applied over its cathode-to-anode junction with no further gate modulation being required, i.e., the device is biased fully on. This is not to be confused with asymmetrical operation, as the output is unidirectional, flowing only from cathode to anode, and so is asymmetrical in nature.

Thyristors can be used as the control elements for phase-angle-triggered controllers, also known as phase-fired controllers.

They can also be found in power supplies for digital circuits, where they are used as a sort of "enhanced circuit breaker" to prevent a failure in the power supply from damaging downstream components. A thyristor is used in conjunction with a Zener diode attached to its gate; and if the output voltage of the supply rises above the Zener voltage, then the thyristor will conduct and short-circuit the power supply output to ground (in general also tripping an upstream breaker or fuse). This kind of protection circuit is known as a crowbar, and has the advantage over a standard circuit breaker or fuse in that it creates a high-conductance path to ground from damaging supply voltage and potentially for stored energy (in the system being powered).

The first large-scale application of thyristors, with associated triggering diac, in consumer products related to stabilized power supplies within color television receivers in the early 1970s. The stabilized high-voltage DC supply for the receiver was obtained by moving the switching point of the thyristor device up and down the falling slope of the positive-going half of the AC supply input (if the rising slope was used, the output voltage would always rise towards the peak input voltage when the device was triggered and thus defeat the aim of regulation). The precise switching point was determined by the load on the DC output supply, as well as AC input fluctuations.

Thyristors have been used for decades as light dimmers in television, motion pictures, and theater, where they replaced inferior technologies such as autotransformers and rheostats. They have also been used in photography as a critical part of flashes (strobes).

=== Snubber circuits ===
Thyristors can be triggered by a high rise-rate of off-state voltage. Upon increasing the off-state voltage across the anode and cathode of the thyristor, there will be a flow of charges similar to the charging current of a capacitor. The maximum rate of rise of off-state voltage or dV/dt rating of a thyristor is an important parameter, since it indicates the maximum rate of rise of anode voltage that does not bring the thyristor into conduction when no gate signal is applied. When the flow of charges due to rate of rise of off-state voltage across the anode and cathode of the thyristor becomes equal to the flow of charges as injected when the gate is energized, then it leads to random and false triggering of thyristor, which is undesired.

This is prevented by connecting a resistor-capacitor (RC) snubber circuit between the anode and cathode in order to limit the dV/dt (i.e., rate of voltage change over time). Snubbers are energy-absorbing circuits used to suppress the voltage spikes caused by the circuit's inductance when a switch, electrical or mechanical, opens. The most common snubber circuit is a capacitor and resistor connected in series across the switch (transistor).

=== HVDC electricity transmission ===
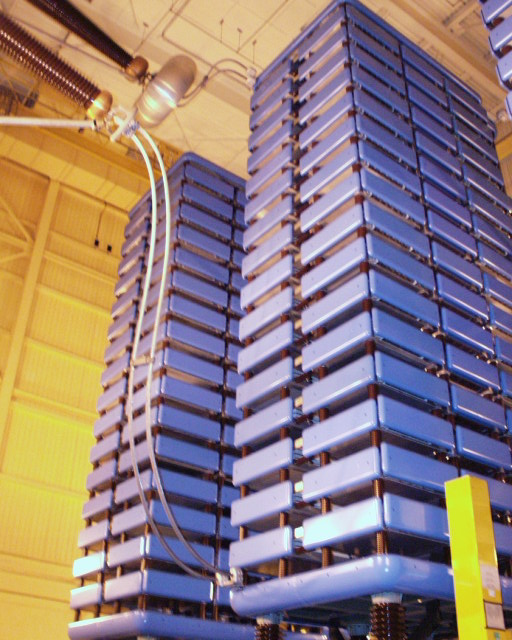
Valve hall containing thyristor valve stacks used for long-distance transmission of power from Manitoba Hydro dams

Since modern thyristors can switch power on the scale of megawatts, thyristor valves have become the heart of high-voltage direct current (HVDC) conversion either to or from alternating current. In the realm of this and other very high-power applications, both electrically triggered (ETT) and light-triggered (LTT) thyristors are still the primary choice. Thyristors are arranged into a diode bridge circuit and to reduce harmonics are connected in series to form a 12-pulse converter. Each thyristor is cooled with deionized water, and the entire arrangement becomes one of multiple identical modules forming a layer in a multilayer valve stack called a quadruple valve. Three such stacks are typically mounted on the floor or hung from the ceiling of the valve hall of a long-distance transmission facility.

== Comparisons to other devices ==
The functional drawback of a thyristor is that, like a diode, it only conducts in one direction, so it cannot be safely used with alternating current. A similar self-latching 5-layer device, called a TRIAC, is able to work in both directions. This added capability, though, also can become a shortfall. Because the TRIAC can conduct in both directions, reactive loads can cause it to fail to turn off during the zero-voltage instants of the AC power cycle. Because of this, use of TRIACs with (for example) heavily inductive motor loads usually requires the use of a "snubber" circuit around the TRIAC to assure that it will turn off with each half-cycle of mains power. Inverse parallel SCRs can also be used in place of the TRIAC; because each SCR in the pair has an entire half-cycle of reverse polarity applied to it, the SCRs, unlike TRIACs, are sure to turn off. The "price" to be paid for this arrangement, however, is the added complexity of two separate, but essentially identical, gating circuits.

Although thyristors are heavily used in megawatt-scale rectification of AC to DC, in low- and medium-power (from few tens of watts to few tens of kilowatts) applications, they have virtually been replaced by other devices with superior switching characteristics like power MOSFETs or IGBTs. One major problem associated with SCRs is that they are not fully controllable switches. The GTO thyristor and IGCT are two devices related to the thyristor that address this problem. In high-frequency applications, thyristors are poor candidates due to long switching times arising from bipolar conduction. MOSFETs, on the other hand, have much faster switching capability because of their unipolar conduction (only majority carriers carry the current).

== See also ==
- Thyristor-controlled reactor
- Insulated-gate bipolar transistor
- Latch-up
- Quadrac
- Thyratron
- Thyristor drive
- Gate turn-off thyristor

== Sources ==
- Wintrich, Arendt; Nicolai, Ulrich; Tursky, Werner; Reimann, Tobias (2011). Application Manual Power Semiconductors 2011 (PDF) (2 ed.). Nuremberg, Germany: Semikron. ISBN 978-3-938843-66-6. Archived from the original (PDF) on 2013-09-16.
- Thyristor Theory and Design Considerations (PDF). ON Semiconductor. June 2005. HBD855/D Rev. 0. Archived (PDF) from the original on 2025-08-31. (1+240 pages)
- Nicolai, Ulrich; Reimann, Tobias; Petzoldt, Jürgen; Lutz, Josef (1998). Application Manual IGBT and MOSFET Power Modules (1 ed.). ISLE Verlag. ISBN 3-932633-24-5. Archived from the original on 2012-03-02.
- General Electric Corporation, ed. (1979). SCR Manual (6 ed.). Prentice-Hall.
