= Richard Victor Jones =

American physicist (1929–2019)

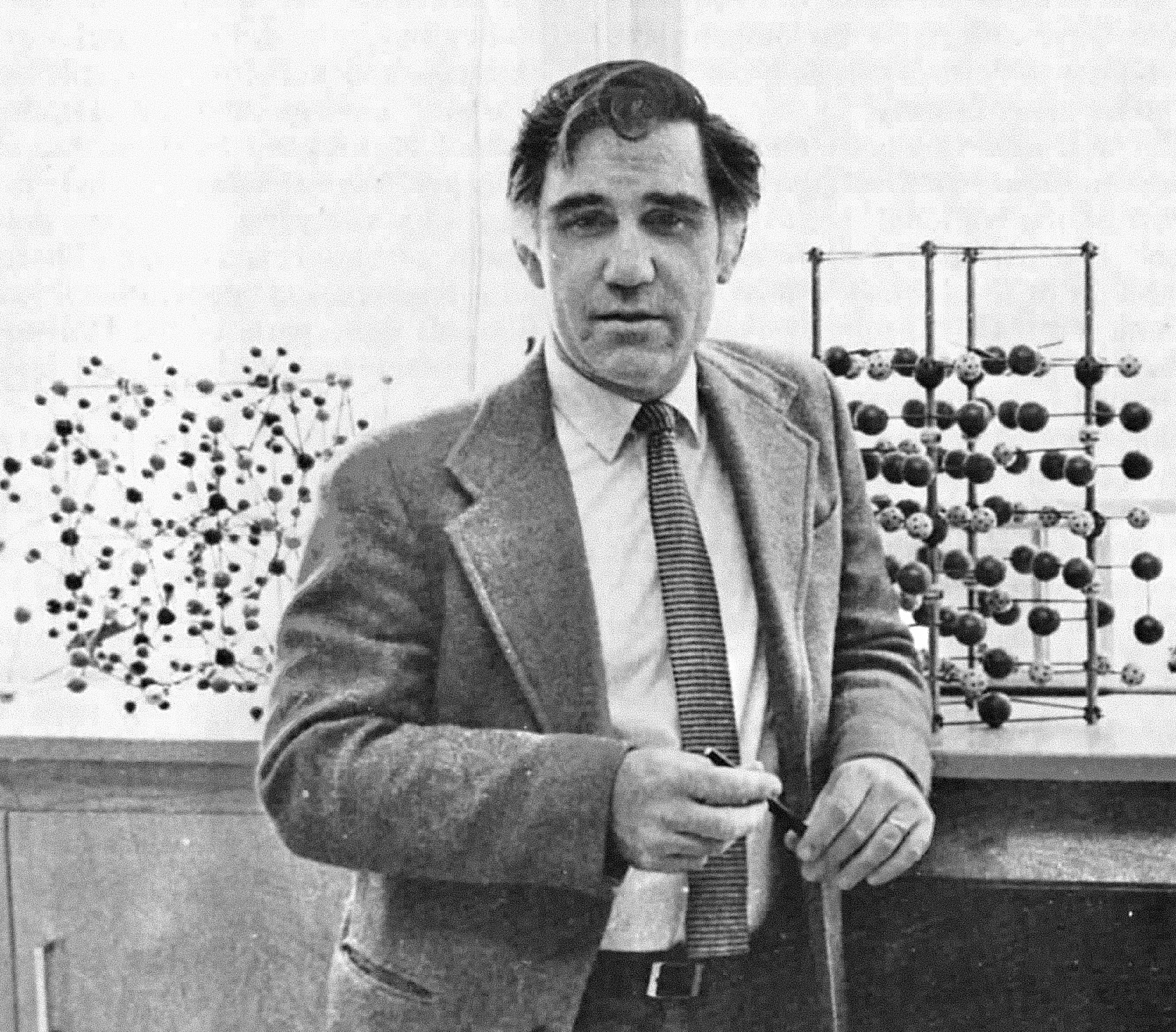
- Professor R. V. Jones, November 1971.
- Born: June 8, 1929
- Died: November 11, 2019 (aged 90)
- Education: University of California, Berkeley (PhD)
- Known for: Semiconductor pioneer
- Scientific career
- Fields: Physics
- Workplaces: Shockley Semiconductor Laboratory; Harvard University

Richard Victor Jones (1929 – November 11, 2019) was a professor of applied physics at Harvard University and a pioneer in semiconductors. He was one of the first four recruits by William Shockley to help develop technologies at Shockley Semiconductor Laboratory.

== Early life ==
Jones was a first-generation child of Welsh immigrants. He attended university at Berkeley, where he performed his thesis research on magnetic resonance under Carson D. Jeffries.

== Career ==
During the winter of 1954–1955, William Shockley decided to seek a sponsor to help him establish production of complex transistors and his own Shockley diodes. He was initially supported by Raytheon, but the agreement was soon canceled by that company. After Shockley subsequently established Shockley Semiconductor Laboratory under the umbrella of Beckman Instruments, he recruited William W. Happ who he knew from Raytheon. Shockley's other three initial recruits were George Smoot Horsley and Leopoldo B. Valdes both of whom he knew from Bell Labs, and Jones, who was then a new Berkeley graduate.

Jones remained with Shockley for two years until 1957 when he left to teach physics at Harvard. From 1964 to 1982, he was the Gordon McKay Professor of Applied Physics and in 1982 he was named Robert L. Wallace Professor. Much of his teaching and research at Harvard was focused on physics information technology, including acoustical and optical signals used to process and obtain information (applied to fields such as seismic exploration, optical computing, medical ultrasonics and acoustic microscopy) wave phenomena and digital electronics. In 1960, he was awarded a Guggenheim Fellowship.
