= Quadrac =

A QUADRAC is a special type of thyristor which combines a DIAC and a TRIAC in a single package. The DIAC is the triggering device for the TRIAC. Thyristors are four-layer (PNPN) semiconductor devices that act as switches, rectifiers or voltage regulators. When triggered, thyristors turn on and become low-resistance current paths. They remain so even after the trigger is removed, and continue until the current is reduced to a certain level (or until they are triggered off). DIACS are bi-directional diodes that switch AC voltages and trigger TRIACS or silicon-controlled rectifiers (SCRs). Except for a small leakage current, DIACS do not conduct until the breakover voltage is reached. TRIACS are three-terminal, silicon devices that function as two SCRs configured in an inverse, parallel arrangement. They provide load current during both halves of the AC supply voltage. By combining the functions of DIACS and TRIACS, QUADRACs eliminate the need to assemble discrete parts.

== Applications ==
QUADRACs are used in lighting control, speed control, and temperature modulation control applications. They carry performance specifications such as peak repetitive off voltage, peak repetitive reverse voltage, root mean square (RMS) on-state current, and temperature junction.

Peak repetitive off voltage is the maximum, instantaneous value of the off-state voltage that occurs across a thyristor, including all repetitive transient voltages and excluding all non-transient voltages. Peak repetitive reverse voltage is the maximum peak reverse voltage that may be applied continuously to the main terminals (anode and cathode) of QUADRACs. RMS on-state current is the maximum RMS current allowed for the specified use-case temperature. Temperature junction for QUADRACs is expressed as a full-required range.

== Packages ==
QUADRACs are available in multiple integrated circuit (IC) package types with varying numbers of pins. Basic IC packages types for QUADRACs include discrete packaging (DPAK), power packaging (PPAK), and in-line packaging (IPAK). Other IC package types include diode outline (DO), transistor outline (TO), and small outline transistor (SOT). QUADRACs that use metal electrode leadless face (MELF) packaging have metallized terminals at each end of a cylindrical body. Other QUADRAC package types include thin small outline package (TSOP), thin shrink small outline L-leaded package (TSSOP), and thin small outline J-lead (TSOJ) package.

== See also ==
- TRIAC
