= DIAC =

Type of diode

- Component type: Passive
- Pin names: anode 1, anode 2

Electronic symbol

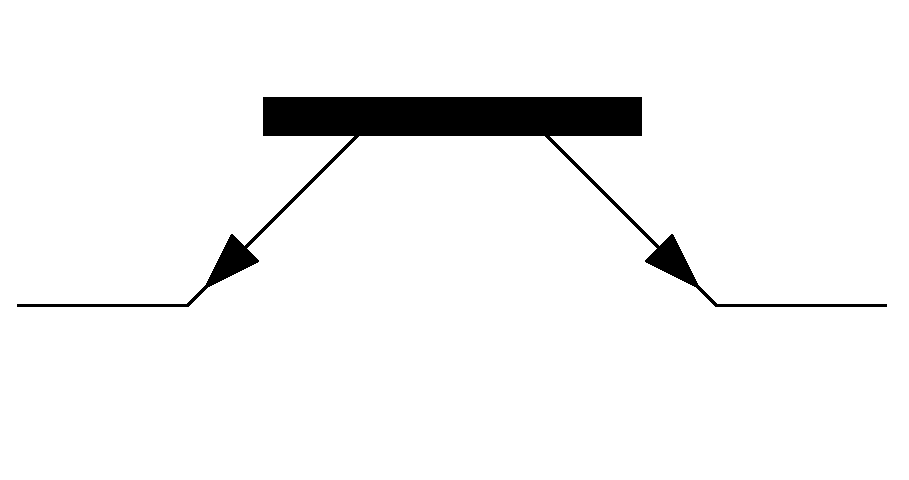
Three-layer DIAC

The DIAC (diode for alternating current) is a diode that conducts electrical current only after its breakover voltage, V_{BO}, has been reached momentarily. Three, four, and five layer structures may be used. Behavior is similar to the voltage breakdown of a TRIAC without a gate terminal.

When breakdown occurs, internal positive feedback (impact ionization or two transistor feedback) ensures that the diode enters a region of negative dynamic resistance, leading to a sharp increase in current through the diode and a decrease in the voltage drop across it (typically full switch-on takes a few hundred nanoseconds to microseconds). The diode remains in conduction until the current through it drops below a value characteristic for the device, called the holding current, I_{H}. Below this threshold, the diode switches back to its high-resistance, non-conducting state. This behavior is bi-directional, meaning typically the same for both directions of current.

Most DIACs have a three-layer structure with breakover voltage of approximately 30 V and an on voltage of less than 3 V. Their behavior is analogous to the striking and extinction voltages of a neon lamp, but it can be more repeatable and takes place at lower voltages.

DIACs have no gate or trigger electrode, unlike some other thyristors that they are commonly used to trigger, such as TRIACs. Some TRIACs, like Quadrac, contain a built-in DIAC in series with the TRIAC's gate terminal for this purpose.

DIACs are also called "symmetrical trigger diodes" due to the symmetry of their characteristic curve. Because DIACs are bidirectional devices, their terminals are not labeled as anode and cathode but as A1 and A2 or main terminal MT1 and MT2.

Typical DIAC voltage and current relationships. V_{BO} is the breakover voltage.

== SIDAC ==
SIDAC

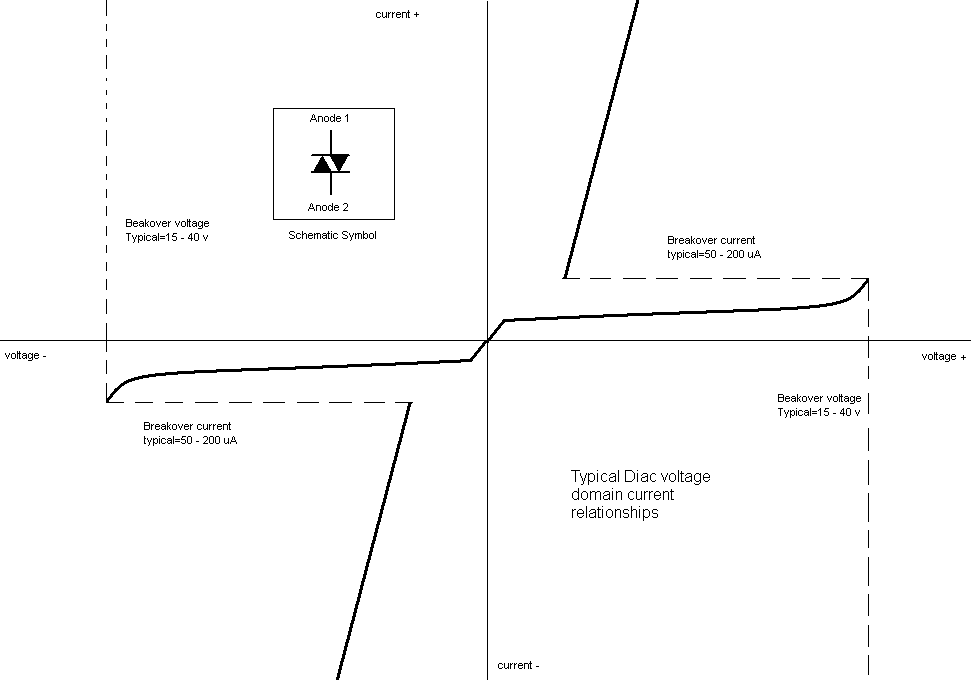
Idealized breakover diode voltage and current relationships. Once the voltage exceeds the turn-on threshold, the device turns on and the voltage rapidly falls while the current increases.

A silicon diode for alternating current (SIDAC) is a less commonly used device, electrically similar to the DIAC, but having, in general, a higher breakover voltage and greater current handling capacity.

The SIDAC is another member of the thyristor family. Also referred to as a SYDAC (silicon thyristor for alternating current), bi-directional thyristor breakover diode, or more simply a bi-directional thyristor diode, it is technically specified as a bilateral voltage triggered switch. Its operation is similar to that of the DIAC, but a SIDAC is always a five-layer device with low-voltage drop in latched conducting state, more like a voltage triggered TRIAC without a gate. In general, SIDACs have higher breakover voltages and current handling capacities than DIACs, so they can be directly used for switching and not just for triggering of another switching device.

The operation of the SIDAC is functionally similar to that of a spark gap, but is unable to reach its higher temperature ratings. The SIDAC remains nonconducting until the applied voltage meets or exceeds its rated breakover voltage. Once entering this conductive state going through the negative dynamic resistance region, the SIDAC continues to conduct, regardless of voltage, until the applied current falls below its rated holding current. At this point, the SIDAC returns to its initial nonconductive state to begin the cycle once again.

Somewhat uncommon in most electronics, the SIDAC is relegated to the status of a special purpose device. However, where part-counts are to be kept low, simple relaxation oscillators are needed, and when the voltages are too low for practical operation of a spark gap, the SIDAC is an indispensable component.

Similar devices, though usually not functionally interchangeable with SIDACs, are the thyristor surge protection device (TSPD) sold under trademarks like Trisil by STMicroelectronics and SIDACtor and its predecessor Surgector by Littelfuse. These are designed to tolerate large surge currents for the suppression of overvoltage transients. In many applications this function is now served by metal oxide varistors (MOVs), particularly for trapping voltage transients on the power mains.

== Applications ==
DIACs and SIDACs are often used to deliver a pulse once a capacitor has charged to the breakdown voltage, giving both controlled delay set by the charging resistor and a fixed pulse energy set by the capacitor and breakdown voltage. This is common in simple phase angle controls for AC lamp dimmers and motor speed controls. They may also be used to sense over-voltage fault conditions to provide a 'crowbar' function to operate a fuse or a latching alarm that can only be reset by removing the supply.

== See also ==
- Zener diode
- Shockley diode
