= Integrated gate-commutated thyristor =

Power semiconductor electronic device

- Component type: Active
- First produced: ABB; Mitsubishi
- Pin names: Anode, gate, and cathode

Electronic symbol

The integrated, gate-commutated thyristor (IGCT) is a power semiconductor device, used for switching electric current in industrial equipment. It is related to, and an evolution of, the gate turn-off (GTO) thyristor.

Mitsubishi and ABB jointly developed the device. Like the GTO thyristor, the IGCT is a fully controllable power switch, meaning that it can be turned both on and off by its control terminal (the gate). Gate drive electronics are integrated with the thyristor.

== Description ==
Top view of a typical 91 mm wafer gate-commutated thyristor with cathode segments arranged in 10 concentric rings and the gate contact placed between the fifth and sixth rings

Typical structure and doping of a gate-commutated thyristor (GCT)

An IGCT is a type of thyristor, consisting of a gate-commutated thyristor (GCT) and a gate drive module integrated as a single unit. This integration allows fast commutation of the conduction current from the cathode to the gate. They can be turned on and off by a gate signal, but unlike GTO thyristors, IGCTs can withstand higher rates of voltage rise (dV/dt), such that no turn-off snubber is generally required, and when turn-off snubbers are used they can be significantly smaller than those required for GTO thyristors.

The structure of an IGCT is similar to a GTO thyristor. In an IGCT, the GTO current is greater than the anode current. This results in a complete elimination of minority carrier injection from the lower PN junction and faster turn-off times. The main differences are a reduction in cell size, and a much more substantial gate connection with much lower inductance in the gate drive circuit and drive circuit connection. The high gate currents and fast dI/dt rise of the gate current mean that regular wires cannot be used to connect the gate drive to the thyristor; instead, the thyristor is mounted directly to the gate drive circuit PCB. The drive circuit surrounds the device and a large circular conductor attaching to the edge of the IGCT is used. The large contact area and short distance reduce both inductance and resistance.

Since IGCTs have much faster turn-off times compared to GTOs, they can switch at higher frequencies than GTOs. While they can handle up to several tens of kHz for very short periods, they turn on and off more slowly than IGBTs and MOSFETs, so most applications limit the continuous switching frequency to around 1,000 Hz.

Neutron-transmutation-doped silicon is used as the IGCT base substrate.

In high power applications, IGCTs are sensitive to cosmic rays. To decrease cosmic ray induced malfunctions, more thickness in the n^{−} base is required.

== Reverse bias ==
IGCTs are available with or without reverse blocking capability. Reverse blocking capability adds to the forward voltage drop because of the need for a long, low-doped P1 region.

IGCTs capable of blocking reverse voltage are termed symmetrical IGCT (S-IGCT or SGCT). Usually, the reverse blocking voltage rating and forward blocking voltage rating are the same. The typical application for symmetrical IGCTs is current source inverters.

IGCTs incapable of blocking reverse voltage are termed asymmetrical IGCT (A-IGCT or AGCT). They typically have a reverse breakdown rating in the tens of volts. A-IGCTs are used where either a reverse conducting diode is applied in parallel (for example, in voltage source inverters) or where reverse voltage would never occur (for example, in switching power supplies or DC traction choppers).

Asymmetrical IGCTs can be fabricated with a reverse conducting diode in the same package. These are termed reverse conducting IGCT (RC-IGCT).

== Applications ==
The main applications are in variable-frequency grid and trackside inverters, drives, traction, and fast AC disconnect switches. IGCTs can be connected in series or in parallel for higher power applications.

== See also ==
- Thyristor
- Gate turn-off thyristor
- Insulated-gate bipolar transistor
