= Carson D. Jeffries =

American physicist

Carson Dunning Jeffries (March 22, 1922 – October 18, 1995) was an American physicist. The National Academies Press said that Jeffries "made major fundamental contributions to knowledge of nuclear magnetism, electronic spin relaxation, dynamic nuclear polarization, electron-hole droplets, nonlinear dynamics and chaos, and high-temperature superconductors." He was noted for being the first to observe the isotropic spin-spin exchange interaction in metals (also known as the Ruderman-Kittel interaction). He also discovered methods for the dynamic nuclear polarization by saturation of forbidden microwave resonance transitions in solids. He also discovered the existence of giant electron-hole droplets in semiconductors. He was a member of the U.S. National Academy of Sciences and the American Academy of Arts and Sciences.

== Life and career ==
Jeffries was born in Lake Charles, Louisiana. Jeffries graduated from Louisiana State University in 1943 with a B.S. degree, and received his doctorate from Stanford University in 1951 where his advisor was Felix Bloch. He joined the faculty of the University of California, Berkeley in 1952 and stayed there for his entire career. Known students of the 35 whose dissertations he advised are R. Victor Jones and Robert Moore Westervelt, both professors at Harvard.

== See also ==
- Inverse cyclotron converter
