= Twin inverted pulse radar =

Twin Inverted Pulse Radar (TWIPR or TWIPS) is a type of radar where a negative and a positive pulse are sent out in quick succession. The twin pulses will cancel each other when hitting objects like trees, foliage, and metals. But a semiconductor device will invert the negative pulse into a positive which will add to the other positive pulse and result in a strong return pulse. This is how dolphins locate fish through a cloud of bubbles.
