= Zero-crossing control =

In electronics, zero-crossing control (ZCC), or burst-fire control, is an approach for electrical control circuits that starts operation with the AC load voltage at close to 0 volts in the AC cycle.

== Details ==
This is in relation to solid-state relays, such as TRIACs and silicon controlled rectifiers. The purpose of the circuit is to start the TRIAC conducting very near the time point when the load voltage is crossing zero (at the beginning or the middle of each AC cycle represented by a sine wave), so that the output voltage begins as a complete sine-wave half-cycle. In other words, if the controlling input signal is applied at any point during the AC output wave other than very close to the zero-voltage point of that wave, the output of the switching device will "wait" to switch on until the output AC wave reaches its next zero point. This is useful when sudden turn-on in the middle of a sine-wave half-cycle could cause undesirable effects like high-frequency spikes, for which the circuit or the environment is not expected to handle gracefully.

The point where the AC line voltage is zero is the zero cross point. When a TRIAC is connected in its simplest form, it can clip the beginning of the voltage curve, due to the minimum gate voltage of the triac. A zero-cross circuit works to correct this problem, so that the TRIAC functions as well as possible. This is typically done with thyristors in two of the three phases.

Many opto-TRIACs come with zero-cross circuits built in. They are often used to control larger, power TRIACs. In this setup TRIAC turn-on delays compound, so quick turn-on times are important.

The corresponding phase-angle circuits are more sophisticated and more expensive than zero-cross circuits.

== See also ==
- Zero-crossing
