= Watkins-Johnson Company =

Defunct American electronics manufacturer

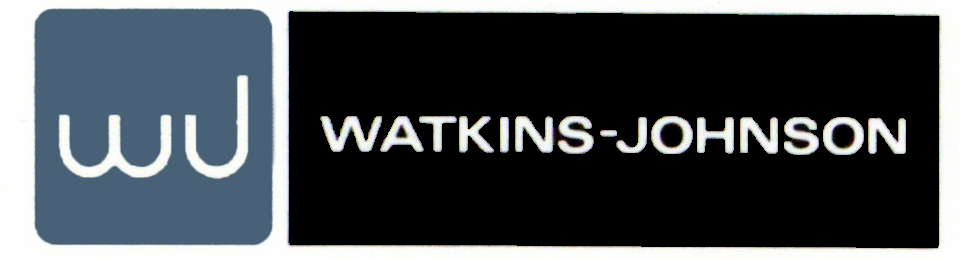
- Company type: Subsidiary
- Industry: Electronics
- Founded: 1957
- Founder: Dean A. Watkins, H. Richard Johnson
- Fate: Acquired by TriQuint Semiconductor
- Successor: WJ Communications Inc.
- Headquarters: Palo Alto, California
- Key people: W. Keith Kennedy (former CEO)

Watkins-Johnson Company was a designer and manufacturer of electronic devices, systems, and equipment. The company, commonly referred to as "W-J", was formed in 1957 by Dean A. Watkins and H. Richard Johnson, and was headquartered in Palo Alto, California. Its products included microwave tubes, followed by solid-state microwave devices, electronic warfare subsystems and systems, receiving equipment, antennas, furnaces and semiconductor manufacturing equipment, and automated test equipment.

== History ==
Partial Corporate Timeline

- December 1957: Watkins-Johnson Company was founded
- June 1963: Acquired Stewart Engineering Company, a manufacturer of backward-wave oscillators
- Fall 1967: Acquired Communication Electronics, Inc. (CEI) of Rockville, Maryland, producer of receivers and related equipment
- June 1968: Listed on New York Stock Exchange
- 1970: Acquired RELCOM, manufacturer of electronic components such as mixers
- 1970: Acquired antenna product line from Granger Associates
- 1978: Opened plant in San Jose, California
- April 1995: Microwave surveillance systems unit sold to Condor Systems, Inc.
- October 1997: Military devices and subsystem businesses sold to Stellex Industries
- July 1999: Semiconductor Equipment Group sold to Silicon Valley Group
- August 1999: Telecommunications Group sold to Marconi North America
- October 1999: Wireless Products Group sold to Fox-Paine and Company
- August 2000: Initial Public Offering of WJ Communications, W-J successor, by Fox-Paine on NASDAQ
- March 2008: WJ Communications acquired by TriQuint Semiconductor

The Watkins-Johnson plant in Scotts Valley, California was discovered to have soil and groundwater contamination in 1984. It was added to the EPA's Superfund list in 1990.
