= Silicon controlled rectifier =

Four-layer solid-state current-controlling device

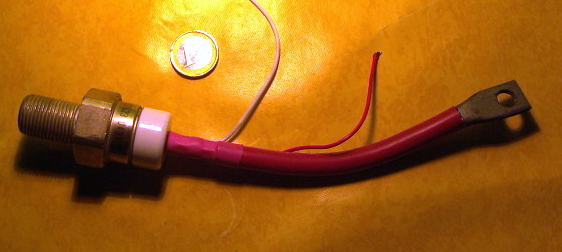
- Silicon controlled rectifier
- Component type: Active
- Working principle: Ian M. Mackintosh (Bell Laboratories)
- Inventor: Gordon Hall and Frank W. "Bill" Gutzwiller
- First produced: General Electric, 1957
- Pin names: Anode, gate and cathode

Electronic symbol

SCR 4-layer (p-n-p-n) diagram

A silicon controlled rectifier or semiconductor controlled rectifier (SCR) is a four-layer solid-state current-controlling device. The name "silicon controlled rectifier" is General Electric's trade name for a type of thyristor. The principle of four-layer p–n–p–n switching was developed by Moll, Tanenbaum, Goldey, and Holonyak of Bell Labs in 1956. The practical demonstration of silicon controlled switching and detailed theoretical behavior of a device in agreement with the experimental results was presented by Dr Ian M. Mackintosh of Bell Laboratories in January 1958. The SCR was developed by a team of power engineers led by Gordon Hall and commercialized by Frank W. "Bill" Gutzwiller in 1957.

Some sources define silicon-controlled rectifiers and thyristors as synonymous while other sources define silicon-controlled rectifiers as a proper subset of the set of thyristors; the latter being devices with at least four layers of alternating n- and p-type material. According to Bill Gutzwiller, the terms "SCR" and "controlled rectifier" were earlier, and "thyristor" was applied later, as usage of the device spread internationally.

SCRs are unidirectional devices (i.e. can conduct current only in one direction) as opposed to TRIACs, which are bidirectional (i.e. charge carriers can flow through them in either direction). SCRs can be triggered normally only by a positive current going into the gate as opposed to TRIACs, which can be triggered normally by either a positive or a negative current applied to its gate electrode.

== Modes of operation ==
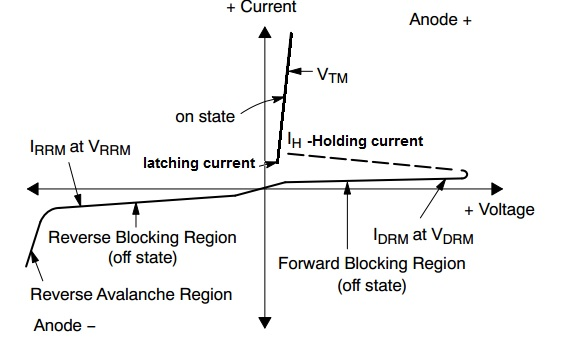
Characteristic curve of a silicon-controlled rectifier

There are three modes of operation for an SCR depending upon the biasing given to it:

1. Forward blocking mode (off state)
2. Forward conduction mode (on state)
3. Reverse blocking mode (off state)

=== Forward blocking mode ===
In this mode of operation, the anode (+, p-doped side) is given a positive voltage while the cathode (−, n-doped side) is given a negative voltage, keeping the gate at zero (0) potential i.e. disconnected. In this case junction J1 and J3 are forward-biased, while J2 is reverse-biased, allowing only a small leakage current from the anode to the cathode. When the applied voltage reaches the breakover value for J2, then J2 undergoes avalanche breakdown. At this breakover voltage J2 starts conducting, but below breakover voltage J2 offers very high resistance to the current and the SCR is said to be in the off state.

=== Forward conduction mode ===
An SCR can be brought from blocking mode to conduction mode in two ways: Either by increasing the voltage between anode and cathode beyond the breakover voltage, or by applying a positive pulse at the gate. Once the SCR starts conducting, no more gate voltage is required to maintain it in the on state. The minimum current necessary to maintain the SCR in the on state on removal of the gate voltage is called the latching current.

There are two ways to turn it off:

1. Reduce the current through it below a minimum value called the holding current, or
2. With the gate turned off, short-circuit the anode and cathode momentarily with a push-button switch or transistor across the junction.

=== Reverse blocking mode ===
When a negative voltage is applied to the anode and a positive voltage to the cathode, the SCR is in reverse blocking mode, making J1 and J3 reverse biased and J2 forward biased. The device behaves as two diodes connected in series. A small leakage current flows. This is the reverse blocking mode. If the reverse voltage is increased, then at critical breakdown level, called the reverse breakdown voltage (V_{BR}), an avalanche occurs at J1 and J3 and the reverse current increases rapidly. SCRs are available with reverse blocking capability, which adds to the forward voltage drop because of the need to have a long, low-doped P1 region. Usually, the reverse blocking voltage rating and forward blocking voltage rating are the same. The typical application for a reverse blocking SCR is in current-source inverters.

An SCR incapable of blocking reverse voltage is known as an asymmetrical SCR, abbreviated ASCR. It typically has a reverse breakdown rating in the tens of volts. ASCRs are used where either a reverse conducting diode is applied in parallel (for example, in voltage-source inverters) or where reverse voltage would never occur (for example, in switching power supplies or DC traction choppers).

Asymmetrical SCRs can be fabricated with a reverse conducting diode in the same package. These are known as RCTs, for reverse conducting thyristors.

== Thyristor turn-on methods ==
1. forward-voltage triggering
2. gate triggering
3. dV/dt triggering
4. thermal triggering
5. light triggering

Forward-voltage triggering occurs when the anode–cathode forward voltage is increased with the gate circuit opened. This is known as avalanche breakdown, during which junction J2 will break down. At sufficient voltages, the thyristor changes to its on state with low voltage drop and large forward current. In this case, J1 and J3 are already forward-biased.

In order for gate triggering to occur, the thyristor should be in the forward blocking state where the applied voltage is less than the breakdown voltage, otherwise forward-voltage triggering may occur. A single small positive voltage pulse can then be applied between the gate and the cathode. This supplies a single gate current pulse that turns the thyristor onto its on state. In practice, this is the most common method used to trigger a thyristor.

Temperature triggering occurs when the width of depletion region decreases as the temperature is increased. When the SCR is near VPO a very small increase in temperature causes junction J2 to be removed which triggers the device.

== Simple SCR circuit ==
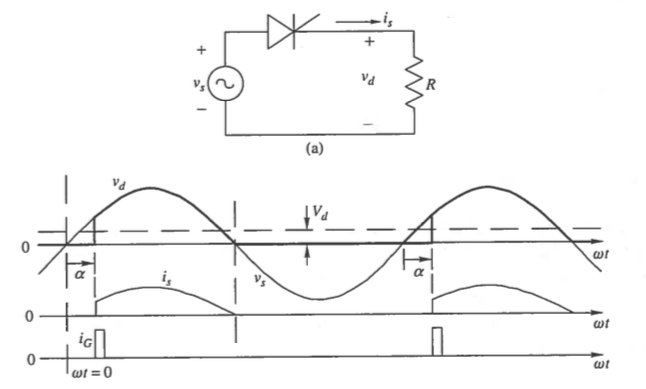
A simple SCR circuit with a resistive load

A simple SCR circuit can be illustrated using an AC voltage source connected to a SCR with a resistive load. Without an applied current pulse to the gate of the SCR, the SCR is left in its forward blocking state. This makes the start of conduction of the SCR controllable. The delay angle α, which is the instant the gate current pulse is applied with respect to the instant of natural conduction (ωt = 0), controls the start of conduction. Once the SCR conducts, the SCR does not turn off until the current through the SCR, i_{s}, becomes negative. i_{s} stays zero until another gate current pulse is applied and SCR once again begins conducting.

== Applications ==
SCRs are mainly used in devices where the control of high power, possibly coupled with high voltage, is demanded. Their operation makes them suitable for use in medium- to high-voltage AC power control applications, such as lamp dimming, power regulators and motor control.

SCRs and similar devices are used for rectification of high-power AC in high-voltage direct current power transmission. They are also used in the control of welding machines, mainly gas tungsten arc welding and similar processes. It is used as an electronic switch in various devices. Early solid-state pinball machines made use of these to control lights, solenoids, and other functions electronically, instead of mechanically, hence the name solid-state.

Other applications include power switching circuits, controlled rectifiers, speed control of DC shunt motors, SCR crowbars, computer logic circuits, timing circuits, and inverters.

== Comparison with SCS ==
A silicon-controlled switch (SCS) behaves nearly the same way as an SCR; but there are a few differences. Unlike an SCR, an SCS switches off when a positive voltage/input current is applied to another anode gate lead. Unlike an SCR, an SCS can be triggered into conduction when a negative voltage/output current is applied to that same lead.

SCSs are useful in practically all circuits that need a switch that turns on/off through two distinct control pulses. This includes power-switching circuits, logic circuits, lamp drivers, and counters.

== Compared to TRIACs ==
A TRIAC resembles an SCR in that both act as electrically controlled switches. Unlike an SCR, a TRIAC can pass current in either direction. Thus, TRIACs are particularly useful for AC applications. TRIACs have three leads: a gate lead and two conducting leads, referred to as MT1 and MT2. If no current/voltage is applied to the gate lead, the TRIAC switches off. On the other hand, if the trigger voltage is applied to the gate lead, the TRIAC switches on.

TRIACs are suitable for light-dimming circuits, phase-control circuits, AC power-switching circuits, AC motor control circuits, etc.

== See also ==
- Bipolar junction transistor
- Crowbar (circuit)
- DIAC
- Gate turn-off thyristor
- High-voltage direct current
- Insulated-gate bipolar transistor
- Integrated gate-commutated thyristor
- Snubber
- Voltage regulator
