= Gate turn-off thyristor =

Semiconductor device

Gate turn-off thyristor (GTO)
- Simplified cross-section of a GTO thyristor
- Component type: active
- Inventor: General Electric
- Pin names: anode, gate, cathode

Electronic symbol

A gate turn-off thyristor (GTO) is a type of high-power thyristor that, unlike a normal thyristor, is fully controllable and can be turned on and off by its gate lead.

It was invented by General Electric.

== Device description ==
Equivalent circuit of a GTO thyristor

Normal thyristors (silicon-controlled rectifiers) are not fully controllable switches (a fully controllable switch can be turned on and off at will). Thyristors can only be turned on using the gate lead, but cannot be turned off using the gate lead. Thyristors are switched on by a gate signal, but even after the gate signal is de-asserted (removed, reverse biased), the thyristor remains in the on state until a turn-off condition occurs (which can be the application of a reverse voltage to the terminals or a decrease of the forward current below a certain threshold value known as the holding current). Thus, a thyristor behaves like a normal semiconductor diode after it is turned on, or fired.

The GTO can be turned on by a gate signal and can also be turned off by a gate signal of negative polarity.

Turn-on is accomplished by a positive current pulse between the gate and cathode terminals. As the gate-cathode behaves like PN junction, there will be some relatively small voltage between the terminals. The turn-on phenomenon in GTO is, however, not as reliable as an SCR (thyristor), and a small positive gate current must be maintained even after turn on to improve reliability.

Turn-off is accomplished by a negative voltage pulse between the gate and cathode terminals. Some of the forward current (about one-third to one-fifth) is stolen and used to induce a cathode-gate voltage, which in turn causes the forward current to fall, and the GTO will switch off (transitioning to the blocking state).

GTO thyristors suffer from long switch-off times, whereby after the forward current falls, there is a long tail time where residual current continues to flow until all remaining charge from the device is taken away. This restricts the maximum switching frequency to about 1 kHz. However, the turn-off time of a GTO is still approximately ten times faster than that of a comparable SCR.

To assist with the turn-off process, GTO thyristors are usually constructed from a large number (hundreds or thousands) of small thyristor cells connected in parallel.

Comparison of an SCR and GTO of same rating
Characteristic	Description	Thyristor (1600 V, 350 A)	GTO (1600 V, 350 A)
V_{T on}	On-state voltage drop	1.5 V	3.4 V
t_{on}, I_{g on}	Turn-on time, gate current	8 μs, 200 mA	2 μs, 2 A
t_{off}	Turn-off time	150 μs	15 μs

A distributed buffer gate turn-off thyristor (DB-GTO) is a thyristor with additional PN layers in the drift region to reshape the field profile and increase the voltage blocked in the off state. Compared to a typical PNPN structure of a conventional thyristor, the DB-GTO thyristor has a PN–PN–PN structure.

== Reverse bias ==
GTO thyristors are available with or without reverse blocking capability. Reverse blocking capability adds to the forward voltage drop because of the need to have a long, low-doped P1 region.

GTO thyristors capable of blocking reverse voltage are known as Symmetrical GTO thyristors, abbreviated S-GTO. Usually, the reverse blocking voltage rating and forward blocking voltage rating are the same. The typical application for symmetrical GTO thyristors is in the current source inverter.

GTO thyristors incapable of blocking reverse voltage are known as asymmetrical GTO thyristors, abbreviated A-GTO, and are generally more common than Symmetrical GTO thyristors. They typically have a reverse breakdown rating in the tens of volts. A-GTO thyristors are used where either a reverse conducting diode is applied in parallel (for example, in voltage source inverters) or where reverse voltage would never occur (for example, in switching power supplies or DC traction choppers).

GTO thyristors can be fabricated with a reverse conducting diode in the same package. These are known as reverse-conducting GTOs, or RCGTO.

== Safe operating area ==
Unlike the insulated-gate bipolar transistor (IGBT), the GTO thyristor requires external snubber circuits to shape the turn-on and turn-off currents to prevent device destruction.

During turn-on, the device has a maximum dI/dt rating limiting the rise of current. This is to allow the entire bulk of the device to reach turn on before full current is reached. If this rating is exceeded, the area of the device nearest the gate contacts will overheat and can melt from overcurrent. The rate of dI/dt is usually controlled by adding a saturable reactor (turn-on snubber), although turn-on dI/dt is a less serious constraint with GTO thyristors than it is with SCRs, as GTOs are constructed from many small thyristor cells in parallel. Reset of the saturable reactor usually places a minimum off-time requirement on GTO-based circuits.

During turn-off, current concentrates into thin regions ("filaments"), creating localized hot spots. The forward voltage of the device therefore must be limited until the current tails off. If the voltage rises too fast at turn-off, not all of the device will turn off, and the resulting current crowding can cause the GTO to fail, possibly explosively. Substantial snubber circuits are added around GTO thyristors to limit the rise of voltage at turn off, and resetting the snubber circuit usually places minimum on-time requirements for GTO thyristors.

Minimum on- and off-times are handled in DC motor chopper circuits by using a variable switching frequency at the lowest and highest duty cycle. This is observable in traction applications where the frequency will ramp up as the motor starts, then the frequency stays constant over most of the speed ranges, then the frequency drops back down to zero at full speed.

== Applications ==
The main applications are in variable-speed motor drives, high-power inverters, and traction. GTOs are increasingly being replaced by integrated gate-commutated thyristors (IGCTs), which are an evolutionary development of the GTO, and insulated-gate bipolar transistors (IGBTs), which are members of the transistor family.

They are also used in the starter circuits for fluorescent lamps.
