= Bidirectional current =

A bidirectional current (BidC) is an electric current which both charges and discharges at once. It is a current that flows primarily in one direction and then in the other.

Complicated systems which have integrated recharging capability sometimes resort to using bidirectional currents, as in laptops or other systems. Monitoring of a bidirectional current is required for a laptop to report the battery level and charging status. Components are available for this purpose.

== See also ==
- Difference amplifier
