= Shockley diode =

Four layer semiconductor diode

- Component type: Active
- First produced: 1950s
- First produced by: Shockley Semiconductor Laboratory
- Pin names: Anode and cathode

Electronic symbol

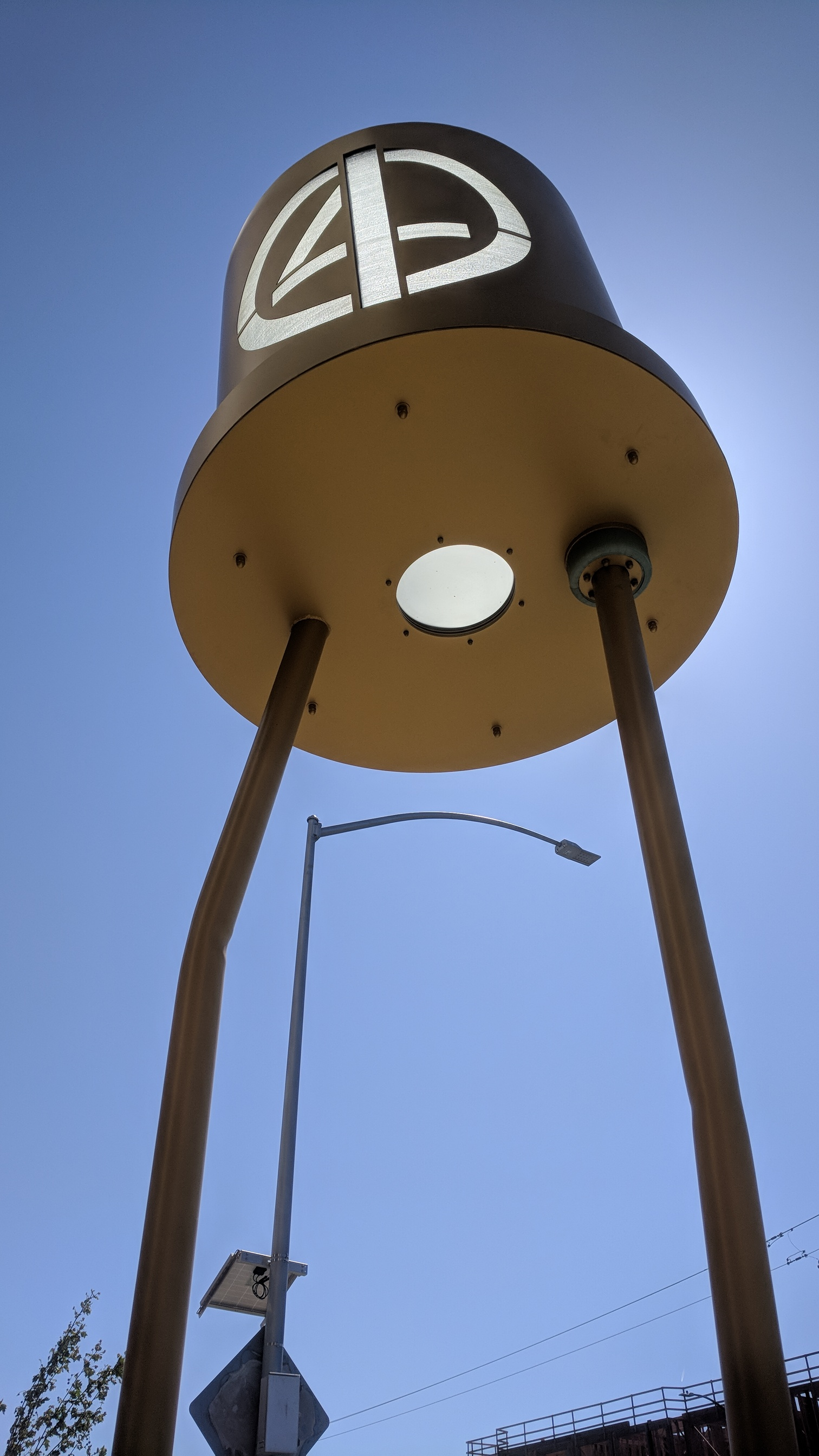
A sculpture representing a Shockley 4-layer diode, on the sidewalk in front of the new building at 391 San Antonio Rd., Mountain View, California, which was the original site of the Shockley Semiconductor Laboratories where the first silicon device work in Silicon Valley was done

The Shockley diode (named after William Shockley) is a four-layer semiconductor diode. It is a PNPN diode with alternating layers of P-type and N-type material. It is equivalent to a thyristor with a disconnected gate. Shockley diodes were manufactured and marketed by Shockley Semiconductor Laboratory in the late 1950s. The Shockley diode has a negative resistance characteristic. It was largely superseded by the DIAC.

== Working ==
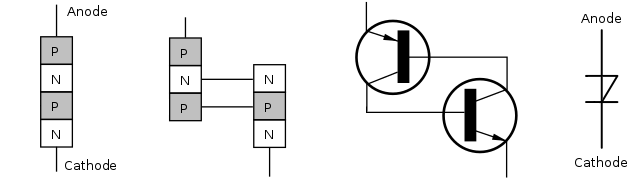
Unlike other semiconductor diodes, the Shockley diode has more than one p–n junction. The construction includes four sections of semiconductors placed alternately between the anode and cathode in the pattern of PNPN. Though it has multiple junctions, it is termed a diode for being a two-terminal device.

The Shockley diode remains in an OFF state, with a very high resistance, until a voltage greater than the trigger voltage is applied across its terminals. When the voltage exceeds the trigger value, the resistance drops to an extremely low value and the device switches ON. The constituent transistors help in maintaining the ON and OFF states. Since the construction resembles a pair of interconnected bipolar transistors, one PNP and other NPN, neither transistor can turn ON until the other is turned ON due to the absence of any current through the base-emitter junction. Once sufficient voltage is applied and one of the transistors breaks down, it starts conducting and allows base current to flow through the other transistor, resulting in saturation of both the transistors, keeping both in ON state.

On reducing the voltage to a sufficiently low level, the current flowing becomes insufficient to maintain the transistor bias. Due to insufficient current, one of the transistors will cut off, interrupting the base current to the other transistor, hence sealing both transistors in the OFF state.

== Usages ==
Common applications:

- Trigger switch for silicon controlled rectifier
- Relaxation oscillator / sawtooth oscillator

Niche applications:

- Audio amplifier

== Typical values ==
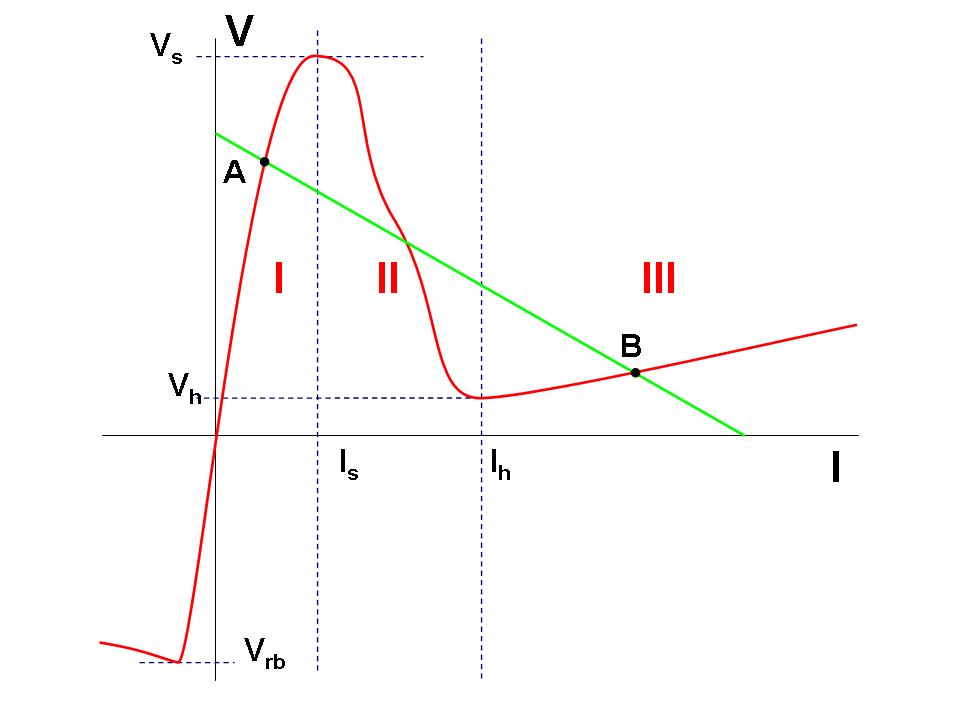
V–I diagram

Description	Range	Typically
Forward operation
Switching voltage V_{s}	10 V to 250 V	50 V ± 4 V
Holding voltage V_{h}	0.5 V to 2 V	0.8 V
Switching current I_{s}	a few μA to some mA	120 μA
Hold current I_{H}	1 to 50 mA	14 to 45 mA
Reverse operation
Reverse current I_{R}		15 μA
Reverse breakdown voltage V_{rb}	10 V to 250 V	60 V

== Dynistor ==
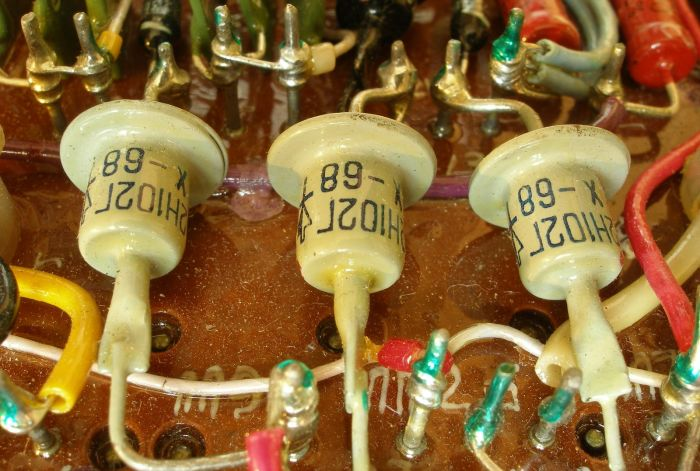
Dynistor

Small-signal Shockley diodes are no longer manufactured, but the unidirectional thyristor breakover diode, also known as the dynistor, is a functionally equivalent power device. An early publication about dynistors was published in 1958. In 1988 the first dynistor using silicon carbide was made. Dynistors can be used as switches in micro- and nanosecond power pulse generators.
