= Electronic symbol =

Pictogram used to represent various electrical and electronic devices or functions

Common circuit diagram symbols (international IEC symbols)

An electronic symbol is a pictogram used to represent various electrical and electronic devices or functions, such as wires, batteries, resistors, and transistors, in a schematic diagram of an electrical or electronic circuit. These symbols are largely standardized internationally today, but may vary from country to country, or engineering discipline, based on traditional conventions.

== Standards for symbols ==
The graphic symbols used for electrical components in circuit diagrams are covered by national and international standards, in particular:

- IEC 60617 DB – current international standard for electronic symbols, currently implemented in various countries as is, such as NF EN 60617 in France or DIN EN 60617 in Germany.
- IEEE/ANSI 315 (also known as ANSI Y32.2-1975 or CSA Z99-1975) – reaffirmed in 1993, inactivated without replacement as of November 7, 2019.
- IEEE/ANSI 91/91a (revision of ANSI Y32.2) – graphic symbols for logic functions (used in digital electronics). It has been inactivated without replacement as of November 7, 2019.
- AS/NZS 1102 (based on a slightly modified version of IEC 60617) – withdrawn without replacement with a recommendation to use IEC 60617.
- JIC (Joint Industrial Council) symbols as approved and adopted by the NMTBA (National Machine Tool Builders Association). They have been extracted from the Appendix of the NMTBA Specification EGPl-1967.
- IEC 61131-3 for ladder-logic symbols.

The standards do not all agree, and use of unusual (even if standardized) symbols can lead to confusion and errors. Symbols usage is sometimes idiosyncratic to engineering disciplines, and national or local variations to international standards exist. For example, lighting and power symbols used as part of architectural drawings may be different from symbols for devices used in electronics.

== Common electronic symbols ==
Symbols shown are typical examples, not a complete list.

=== Traces ===
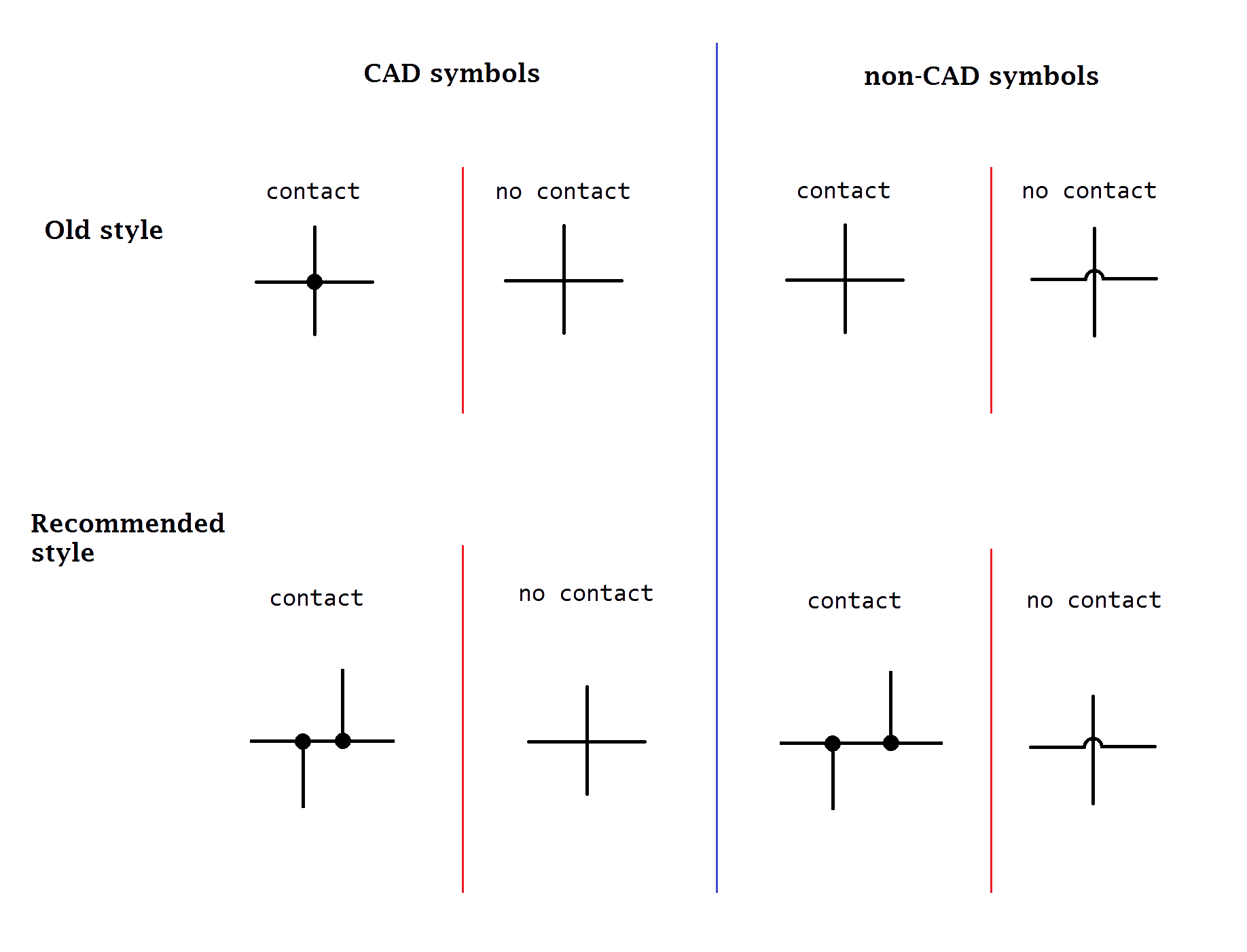
Wire crossover symbols for circuit diagrams. The CAD symbol for insulated crossing wires is the same as the older, non-CAD symbol for non-insulated crossing wires. To avoid confusion, the wire "jump" (semi-circle) symbol for insulated wires in non-CAD schematics is recommended (as opposed to using the CAD-style symbol for no connection), so as to avoid confusion with the original, older style symbol, which means the exact opposite. The newer, recommended style for 4-way wire connections in both CAD and non-CAD schematics is to stagger the joining wires into T-junctions. The large dot signifies an electrical connection.

=== Grounds ===
The shorthand for ground is GND. Optionally, the triangle in the middle symbol may be filled in.

General ground (IEC‑style)

Signal/low-noise ground (the asterisk is not part of the symbol)

Chassis/Earth ground (IEC‑style)

=== Sources ===
Voltage text should be placed next to each battery symbol too, such as "3V".

Battery, single-cell

Battery, multi-cell

Solar (photovoltaic) cell
DC voltage source

Controlled DC voltage source

Current source

Controlled current source

AC voltage source

=== Resistors ===
It is very common for potentiometer and rheostat symbols to be used for many types of variable resistors and trimmers.

ANSI‑style: (a) Resistor, (b) Rheostat, (c) Potentiometer / Trimmer

IEC‑style: (a) Resistor, (b) Rheostat, (c) Potentiometer / Trimmer
Photoresistor (ANSI)

- Thermistor (ANSI).
- Use -t for NTC symbol.
- Use +t for PTC symbol.

Varistor (ANSI)

=== Capacitors ===
Capacitor
(IEC 60617 style)

Polarized capacitor
(IEC 60617 style)

Polarized capacitor (old alternate IEEE 315 style)

Variable capacitor
(IEC 60617 style)

Ganged (co‑moving) variable capacitors
(IEC style)

Trimmer variable capacitor

=== Diodes ===
Optionally, the triangle in these symbols may be filled in, or a line may be drawn through the triangle (less desirable). The words anode and cathode are not part of the diode symbols. For instructional purposes, sometimes one or two letters (A/C or A/K) are placed next to diode symbols similar to how the letters C/B/E or D/G/S are placed next to transistor symbols. "K" is often used instead of "C", because the origin of the word cathode is kathodos, and to avoid confusion with "C" for capacitors in silkscreen of printed circuit boards. Voltage text should be placed next to each zener and TVS diode symbol too, such as "5.1V".

Diode (rectifier)

Schottky diode

Zener diode

TVS (Transient Voltage Suppression) diode. Top is unidirectional, bottom is bidirectional.

LED (Light Emitting Diode)

Photodiode

Tunnel diode

Varicap

Shockley diode

SCR (Silicon Controlled Rectifier)

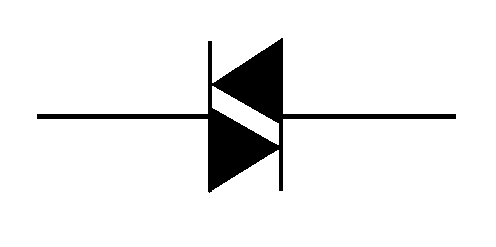
Diac (may be a varistor in older schematics)

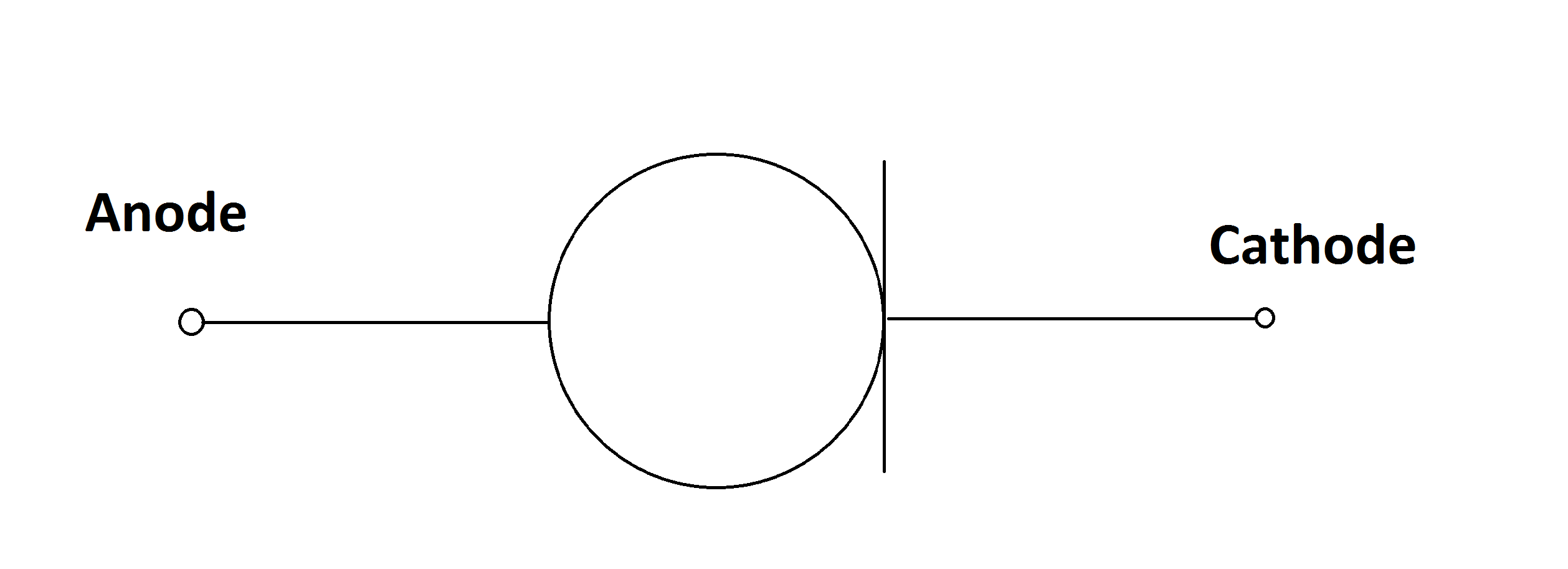
Constant-current diode

Opto-isolator: internal LED (left) and photo transistor (right)

==== Bridge rectifiers ====
There are many ways to draw a single-phase bridge rectifier symbol. Some simplified symbols do not show the internal diodes.

Bridge rectifier

Bridge rectifier

Bridge rectifier

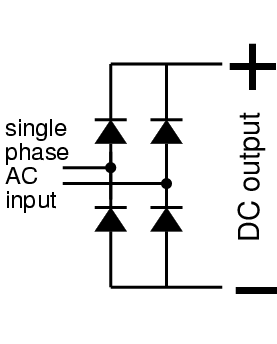
Bridge rectifier

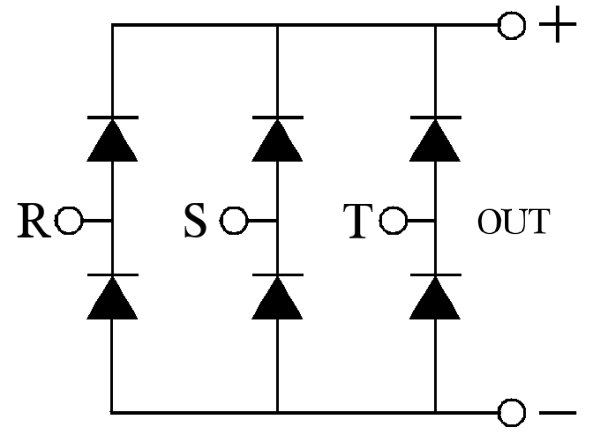
Three-phase bridge rectifier

=== Inductors ===
An inductor can be drawn either as a series of loops, or series of half-circles.

Inductor symbol (series of loops)

Air-core inductor (IEC‑style)

Magnetic-core inductor (IEEE‑style)

Tapped inductor (IEC‑style)

Ferrite bead (IEEE‑style)

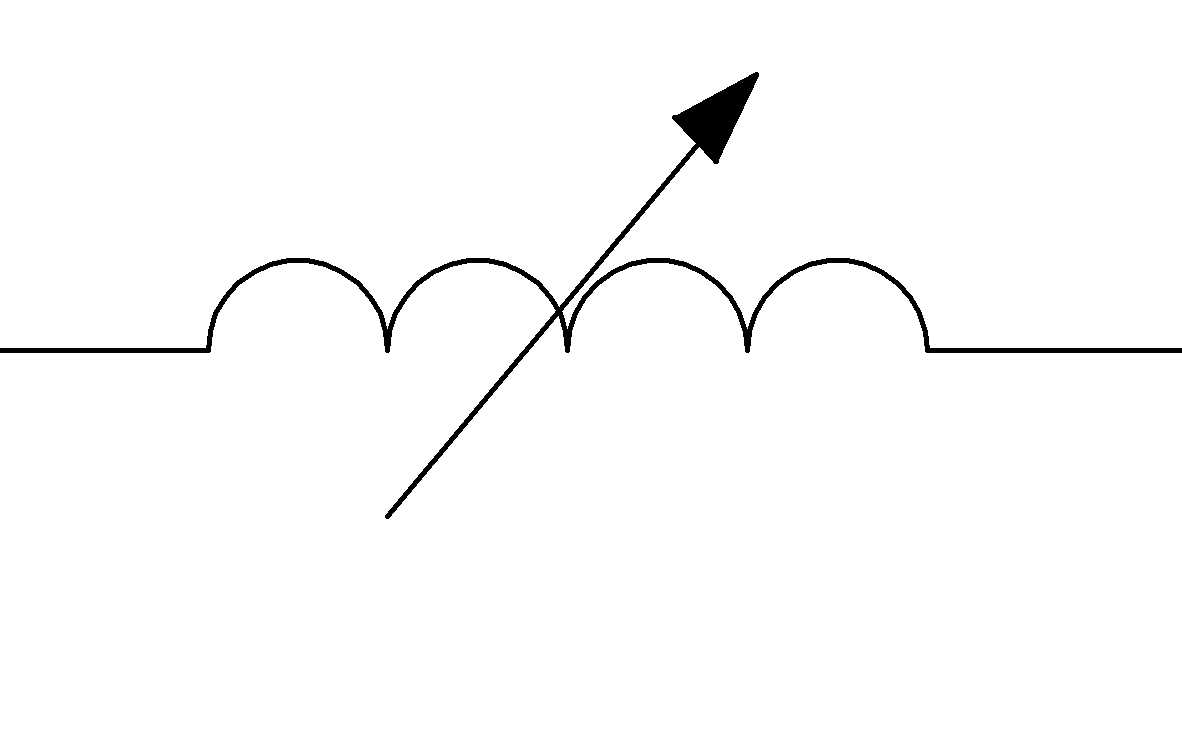
Variable inductor

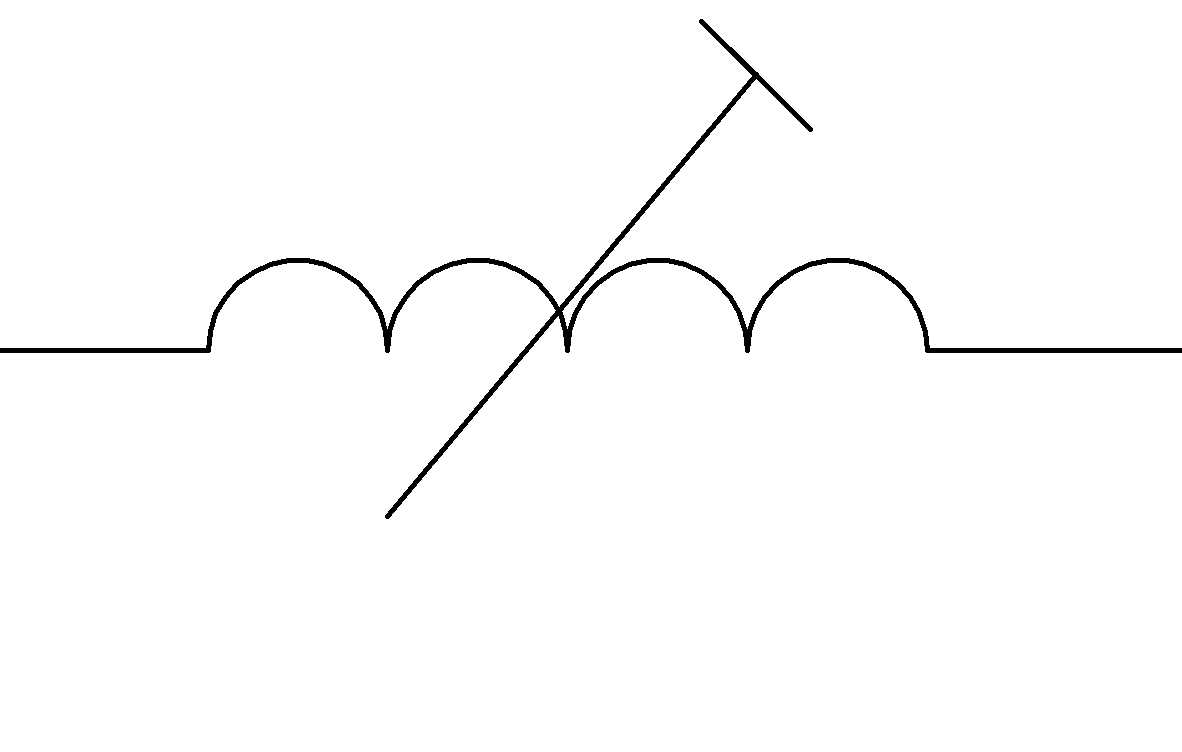
Trimmer variable inductor

=== Transformers ===
Voltage text should be placed on both sides of power transformers, such as 120V (input side) and 6.3V (output side).

Transformer

Transformer with center tap on secondary winding (right side)

Transformer with two secondary windings (right side)

Current transformer

Zero-sequence current transformer (ZSCT) (also known as a window-type current transformer)

Bushing-type current transformer

Voltage transformer

=== Transistors ===
Optionally, transistor symbols may include a circle. Note: The pin letters B/C/E and G/D/S are not part of the transistor symbols.

==== Bipolar ====
NPN bipolar junction transistor (BJT)

PNP bipolar junction transistor (BJT)

NPN Darlington transistor

PNP Darlington transistor

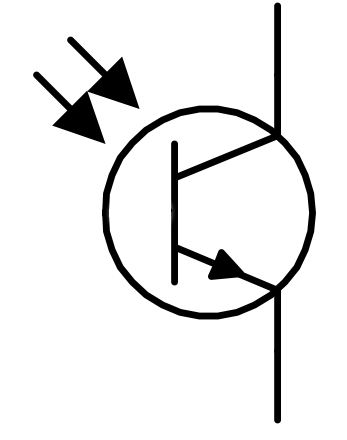
NPN Phototransistor

==== Unipolar ====
N-channel junction gate field-effect transistor (JFET)

P-channel junction gate field-effect transistor (JFET)

Metal–oxide–semiconductor field-effect transistor (MOSFET)

Enhancement mode, N‑channel MOSFET

Enhancement mode, P‑channel MOSFET

=== Vacuum tubes ===
Vacuum tube diode

Vacuum tube triode

Vacuum tube tetrode
(pin letters not part of symbol)

Vacuum tube pentode

=== Switches ===
For multiple pole switches, a dotted or dashed line can be included to indicate two or more switch at the same time (see DPST and DPDT examples below).

Pushbutton, normally open, push-to-make (horizontal line on top)

Pushbutton, normally open, push-to-make (IEEE-style)

Pushbutton, normally closed, push-to-break (IEEE-style)

Pushbutton, normally closed, two circuits (IEEE-style)
Switch, 1P1T, SPST (single-pole single-throw)

Switch, 2P1T, DPST (double-pole single-throw)

Switch, 1P2T, SPDT (single-pole double-throw)

Switch, 2P2T, DPDT (double-pole double-throw)
Slide switch, 1P3T,
break-before-make, nonshorting style

Slide switch, 1P4T,
break-before-make, nonshorting style

Slide switch, 1P4T,
make-before-break, shorting style
Rotary switch, 1P3T,
break-before-make, nonshorting style

Rotary switch, 1P4T,
break-before-make, nonshorting style

Rotary switch, 1P4T,
make-before-break, shorting style
Reed switch, normally open

=== Relays ===
Relays symbols are a combination of an inductor symbol and switch symbol.

Note: The pin letters in these symbols are not part of the standard relay symbol.

SPST, SPDT, DPST, DPDT relays (American‑style)

SPDT relay (IEC‑style)

=== Lamps ===
LED is located in the diode section.

Neon lamp

Indicating lamp (IEEE‑style)

Incandescent lamp

Indicatory incandescent light bulb

Light bulb

=== Current limiters ===
Fuse: (b) IEC, (a,c) IEEE/ANSI 315-1975

Molded-case circuit breaker (MCCB)

=== Voltage limiters ===
TVS and Zener diodes are located in the diode section.

Gas-discharge tubes (GDT) for ESD discharge

Spark gap for ESD discharge

=== Electro-acoustic devices ===
Speaker symbols sometimes include an internal inductor symbol. Impedance text should be placed next to each speaker symbol, such as "8 ohms".

Loudspeaker
(IEEE-style)

Buzzer
(IEC-style)

Microphone
(IEEE-style)

Microphone
(IEC-style)

=== Antennas ===
General antenna
(IEC-style)

Dipole antenna
(IEC-style)

Loop antenna
(IEC-style)

Loop antenna
(IEEE-style)

=== Cables ===
Cable, Shielded 1 conductor

Cable, 2 conductor

Cable, Shielded 2 conductor with shield connected to ground

Cable, 5 conductor

Cable, Shielded 5 conductor

=== Connectors ===
There are numerous connector symbol variations.

Phone connectors. "A" is TS, "B" is TRS, "D" is TRS with two switches.

5x2 shrouded header with notch key and pin names for Olimex UEXT.

DE-9 D-subminiature with host side pin names for RS-232 serial port.

=== ICs ===
==== Logic gates ====
For the symbols below: A and B are inputs, Q is output. Note: These letters are not part of the symbols.

There are variations of these logic gate symbols. Depending on the IC, the two-input gates below may have: 1) two or more inputs; 2) infrequently some have a second inverted Q̅ output too.

Buffer

Inverter (NOT)

AND

NAND

OR

NOR

XOR

XNOR

The above logic symbols may have additional I/O variations too: 1) schmitt trigger inputs, 2) tri-state outputs, 3) open-collector or open-drain outputs (not shown).

Buffer gate with schmitt trigger input

Buffer gate with tri-state output control.
(B is the tri-state control)

==== Flip-flops ====
For the symbols below: Q is output, Q̅ is inverted output, E is enable input, internal triangle shape is clock input, S is Set, R is Reset (some datasheets use clear (CLR) instead of reset along the bottom).

There are variations of these flip-flop symbols. Depending on the IC, a flip-flop may have: 1) one or both outputs (Q only, Q̅ only, both Q & Q̅); 2) one or both forced inputs along top & bottom (R only, S only, both R & S); 3) some inputs may be inverted.

Simple SR flip-flop (inverted S & R inputs)

Gated SR flip-flop

Gated D flip-flop (Transparent Latch)

Clocked D flip-flop
(Set & Reset inputs)

Clocked JK flip-flop

Clocked T flip-flop

==== OpAmps ====
Note: The outside text is not part of these symbols.

Operational amplifier (opamp)

Comparator

==== Voltage Regulator ====
Note: 3pin linear or LDO voltage regulator symbols typically have three words inside their symbols, such as "In" on left side, "Out" on right side", "Gnd" on bottom (for fixed output parts, such as LM7805) or "Adj" on bottom (for adjustable output parts, such as LM317).

3-pin Linear or LDO voltage regulator

Example schematic of
3-pin voltage regulator

=== Oscillators ===
Frequency text should be placed next to each oscillator symbol, such as "16MHz".

Crystal oscillator (IEEE‑style)

Ceramic resonator (3 pins)

=== Miscellaneous devices ===
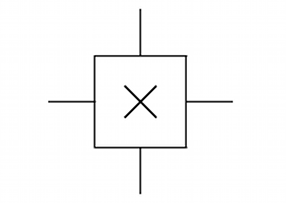
Hall-effect sensor

== Historical electronic symbols ==
The shape of some electronic symbols have changed over time. The following historical electronic symbols can be found in old electronic books / magazines / schematics, and now considered obsolete.

=== Capacitors (historical) ===
All of the following are obsolete capacitor symbols.

Obsolete capacitor (very old style)

Obsolete capacitor

Obsolete capacitor

Obsolete capacitor

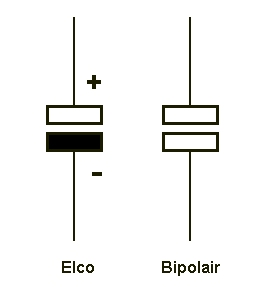
Obsolete capacitor

== See also ==
- Media control symbols
- Circuit diagram
- Reference designator
- Appliance classes which are indicated with symbols
