= Power electronics =

Technology of power electronics

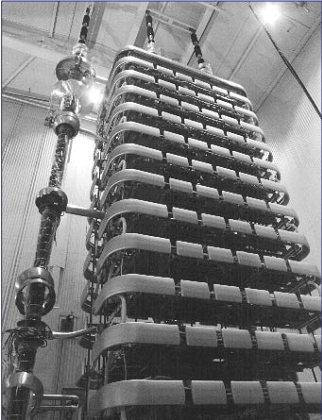
An HVDC thyristor valve tower 16.8 m tall in a hall at Baltic Cable AB in Sweden

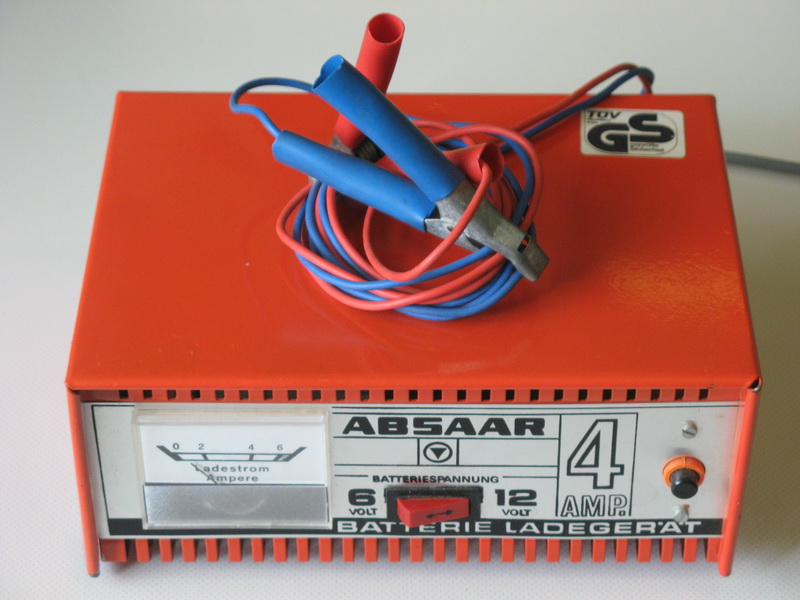
A battery charger is an example of a piece of power electronics.

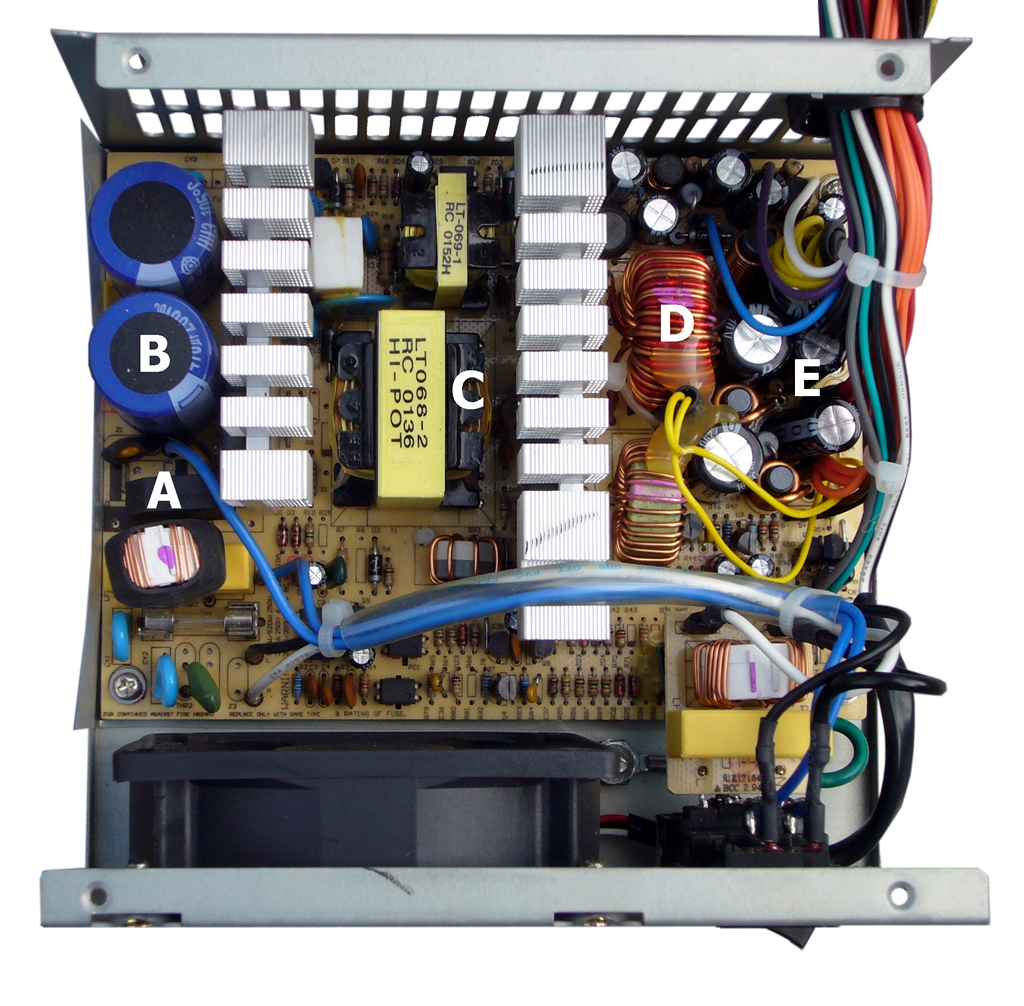
A PC's power supply is an example of a piece of power electronics, whether inside or outside of the cabinet.

Power electronics is the application of electronics to the control and conversion of electric power.

The first high-power electronic devices were made using mercury-arc valves. In modern systems, the conversion is performed with semiconductor switching devices such as diodes, thyristors, and power transistors such as the power MOSFET and IGBT. In contrast to electronic systems concerned with the transmission and processing of signals and data, substantial amounts of electrical energy are processed in power electronics. An AC/DC converter (rectifier) is the most typical power electronics device found in many consumer electronic devices, e.g. television sets, personal computers, battery chargers, etc. The power range is typically from tens of watts to several hundred watts. In industry, a common application is the variable-speed drive (VSD) that is used to control an induction motor. The power range of VSDs starts from a few hundred watts and ends at tens of megawatts.

The power conversion systems can be classified according to the type of the input and output power:

- AC to DC (rectifier)
- DC to AC (inverter)
- DC to DC (DC-to-DC converter)
- AC to AC (AC-to-AC converter)

== History ==
Power electronics started with the development of the mercury-arc rectifier. Invented by Peter Cooper Hewitt in 1902, it was used to convert alternating current (AC) into direct current (DC). From the 1920s on, research continued on applying thyratrons and grid-controlled mercury-arc valves to power transmission. Uno Lamm developed a mercury valve with grading electrodes making them suitable for high-voltage direct current power transmission. In 1933 selenium rectifiers were invented.

Julius Edgar Lilienfeld proposed the concept of a field-effect transistor in 1926, but it was not possible to actually construct a working device at that time. In 1947, the bipolar point-contact transistor was invented by Walter H. Brattain and John Bardeen under the direction of William Shockley at Bell Labs. In 1948 Shockley's invention of the bipolar junction transistor (BJT) improved the stability and performance of transistors, and reduced costs. By the 1950s, higher power semiconductor diodes became available and started replacing vacuum tubes. In 1956, the silicon controlled rectifier (SCR) was introduced by General Electric, greatly increasing the range of power electronics applications. By the 1960s, the improved switching speed of bipolar junction transistors had allowed for high-frequency DC/DC converters.

R. D. Middlebrook made important contributions to power electronics. In 1970, he founded the Power Electronics Group at Caltech. He developed the state-space averaging method of analysis and other tools crucial to modern power electronics design.

=== Power MOSFET ===
In 1957, Frosch and Derick were able to manufacture the first silicon dioxide field effect transistors at Bell Labs, the first transistors in which drain and source were adjacent at the surface. Subsequently, Dawon Kahng led a paper demonstrating a working MOSFET with their Bell Labs team in 1960. Their team included E. E. LaBate and E. I. Povilonis who fabricated the device; M. O. Thurston, L. A. D'Asaro, and J. R. Ligenza who developed the diffusion processes, and H. K. Gummel and R. Lindner who characterized the device.

In 1969, Hitachi introduced the first vertical power MOSFET, which would later be known as the VMOS (V-groove MOSFET). From 1974, Yamaha, JVC, Pioneer Corporation, Sony and Toshiba began manufacturing audio amplifiers with power MOSFETs. International Rectifier introduced a 25 A, 400 V power MOSFET in 1978. This device allows operation at higher frequencies than a bipolar transistor, but is limited to low voltage applications.

The power MOSFET is the most common power device in the world, due to its low gate drive power, fast switching speed, easy advanced paralleling capability, wide bandwidth, ruggedness, easy drive, simple biasing, ease of application, and ease of repair. It has a wide range of power electronic applications, such as portable information appliances, power integrated circuits, cell phones, notebook computers, and the communications infrastructure that enables the Internet.

In 1982, the insulated-gate bipolar transistor (IGBT) was introduced. It became widely available in the 1990s. This component has the power handling capability of the bipolar transistor and the advantages of the isolated gate drive of the power MOSFET.

== Devices ==
The capabilities and economy of power electronics system are determined by the active devices that are available. Their characteristics and limitations are a key element in the design of power electronics systems. Formerly, the mercury-arc valve, the high-vacuum and gas-filled diode thermionic rectifiers, and triggered devices such as the thyratron and ignitron were widely used in power electronics. As the ratings of solid-state devices improved in both voltage and current-handling capacity, vacuum devices have been nearly entirely replaced by solid-state devices.

Power electronic devices may be used as switches, or as amplifiers. An ideal switch is either open or closed and so dissipates no power; it withstands an applied voltage and passes no current or passes any amount of current with no voltage drop. Semiconductor devices used as switches can approximate this ideal property and so most power electronic applications rely on switching devices on and off, which makes systems very efficient as very little power is wasted in the switch. By contrast, in the case of the amplifier, the current through the device varies continuously according to a controlled input. The voltage and current at the device terminals follow a load line, and the power dissipation inside the device is large compared with the power delivered to the load.

Several attributes dictate how devices are used. Devices such as diodes conduct when a forward voltage is applied and have no external control of the start of conduction. Power devices such as silicon-controlled rectifiers and thyristors (as well as the mercury valve and thyratron) allow control of the start of conduction but rely on periodic reversal of current flow to turn them off. Devices such as gate turn-off thyristors, BJT and MOSFET transistors provide full switching control and can be turned on or off without regard to the current flow through them. Transistor devices also allow proportional amplification, but this is rarely used for systems rated more than a few hundred watts. The control input characteristics of a device also significantly affect design; sometimes, the control input is at a very high voltage with respect to ground and must be driven by an isolated source.

As efficiency is at a premium in a power electronic converter, the losses generated by a power electronic device should be as low as possible.

Devices vary in switching speed. Some diodes and thyristors are suited for relatively slow speed and are useful for power frequency switching and control; certain thyristors are useful at a few kilohertz. Devices such as MOSFETS and BJTs can switch at tens of kilohertz up to a few megahertz in power applications, but with decreasing power levels. Vacuum tube devices dominate high power (hundreds of kilowatts) at very high frequency (hundreds or thousands of megahertz) applications. Faster switching devices minimize energy lost in the transitions from on to off and back but may create problems with radiated electromagnetic interference. Gate drive (or equivalent) circuits must be designed to supply sufficient drive current to achieve the full switching speed possible with a device. A device without sufficient drive to switch rapidly may be destroyed by excess heating.

Practical devices have a non-zero voltage drop and dissipate power when on, and take some time to pass through an active region until they reach the "on" or "off" state. These losses are a significant part of the total lost power in a converter.

Power handling and dissipation of devices is also critical factor in design. Power electronic devices may have to dissipate tens or hundreds of watts of waste heat, even switching as efficiently as possible between conducting and non-conducting states. In the switching mode, the power controlled is much larger than the power dissipated in the switch. The forward voltage drop in the conducting state translates into heat that must be dissipated. High power semiconductors require specialized heat sinks or active cooling systems to manage their junction temperature; exotic semiconductors such as silicon carbide have an advantage over straight silicon in this respect, and germanium, once the main-stay of solid-state electronics is now little used due to its unfavorable high-temperature properties.

Semiconductor devices exist with ratings up to a few kilovolts in a single device. Where very high voltage must be controlled, multiple devices must be used in series, with networks to equalize voltage across all devices. Again, switching speed is a critical factor since the slowest-switching device will have to withstand a disproportionate share of the overall voltage. Mercury valves were once available with ratings to 100 kV in a single unit, simplifying their application in HVDC systems.

The current rating of a semiconductor device is limited by the heat generated within the dies and the heat developed in the resistance of the interconnecting leads. Semiconductor devices must be designed so that current is evenly distributed within the device across its internal junctions (or channels); once a "hot spot" develops, breakdown effects can rapidly destroy the device. Certain SCRs are available with current ratings to 3000 amperes in a single unit.

== DC/AC converters (inverters) ==
DC-to-AC converters produce an AC output waveform from a DC source. Applications include adjustable-speed drives (ASD), uninterruptible power supplies (UPS), flexible AC transmission systems (FACTS), voltage compensators, and photovoltaic inverters. Topologies for these converters can be separated into two distinct categories: voltage source inverters and current source inverters. Voltage source inverters (VSIs) are named so because the independently controlled output is a voltage waveform. Similarly, current source inverters (CSIs) are distinct in that the controlled AC output is a current waveform.

DC-to-AC power conversion is the result of power switching devices, which are commonly fully controllable semiconductor power switches. The output waveforms are therefore made up of discrete values, producing fast transitions rather than smooth ones. For some applications, even a rough approximation of the sinusoidal waveform of AC power is adequate. Where a near sinusoidal waveform is required, the switching devices are operated much faster than the desired output frequency, and the time they spend in either state is controlled so the averaged output is nearly sinusoidal. Common modulation techniques include the carrier-based technique, or Pulse-width modulation, space-vector technique, and the selective-harmonic technique.

Voltage source inverters have practical uses in both single-phase and three-phase applications. Single-phase VSIs utilize half-bridge and full-bridge configurations, and are widely used for power supplies, single-phase UPSs, and elaborate high-power topologies when used in multicell configurations. Three-phase VSIs are used in applications that require sinusoidal voltage waveforms, such as ASDs, UPSs, and some types of FACTS devices such as the STATCOM. They are also used in applications where arbitrary voltages are required, as in the case of active power filters and voltage compensators.

Current source inverters are used to produce an AC output current from a DC current supply. This type of inverter is practical for three-phase applications in which high-quality voltage waveforms are required.

A relatively new class of inverters, called multilevel inverters, has gained widespread interest. The normal operation of CSIs and VSIs can be classified as two-level inverters, due to the fact that power switches connect to either the positive or to the negative DC bus. If more than two voltage levels were available to the inverter output terminals, the AC output could better approximate a sine wave. It is for this reason that multilevel inverters, although more complex and costly, offer higher performance.

Each inverter type differs in the DC links used, and in whether or not they require freewheeling diodes. Either can be made to operate in square-wave or pulse-width modulation (PWM) mode, depending on its intended usage. Square-wave mode offers simplicity, while PWM can be implemented in several different ways and produces higher quality waveforms.

Voltage Source Inverters (VSI) feed the output inverter section from an approximately constant-voltage source.

The desired quality of the current output waveform determines which modulation technique needs to be selected for a given application. The output of a VSI is composed of discrete values. In order to obtain a smooth current waveform, the loads need to be inductive at the select harmonic frequencies. Without some sort of inductive filtering between the source and load, a capacitive load will cause the load to receive a choppy current waveform, with large and frequent current spikes.

There are three main types of VSIs:

1. Single-phase half-bridge inverter
2. Single-phase full-bridge inverter
3. Three-phase voltage source inverter

=== Single-phase half-bridge inverter ===
Figure 8: The AC input for an ASD

Figure 9: Single-phase half-bridge voltage source inverter

The single-phase voltage source half-bridge inverters are meant for lower voltage applications and are commonly used in power supplies. Figure 9 shows the circuit schematic of this inverter.

Low-order current harmonics get injected back to the source voltage by the operation of the inverter. This means that two large capacitors are needed for filtering purposes in this design. As Figure 9 illustrates, only one switch can be on at a time in each leg of the inverter. If both switches in a leg were on at the same time, the DC source would be shorted out.

Inverters can use several modulation techniques to control their switching schemes. The carrier-based PWM technique compares the AC output waveform, v_{c}, to a carrier voltage signal, v_{Δ}. When v_{c} is greater than v_{Δ}, S+ is on, and when v_{c} is less than v_{Δ}, S− is on. When the AC output is at frequency fc with its amplitude at v_{c}, and the triangular carrier signal is at frequency f_{Δ} with its amplitude at v_{Δ}, the PWM becomes a special sinusoidal case of the carrier based PWM. This case is dubbed sinusoidal pulse-width modulation (SPWM).For this, the modulation index, or amplitude-modulation ratio, is defined as m_{a} = v_{c}/v_{∆} .

The normalized carrier frequency, or frequency-modulation ratio, is calculated using the equation m_{f} = f_{∆}/f_{c} .

If the over-modulation region, ma, exceeds one, a higher fundamental AC output voltage will be observed, but at the cost of saturation. For SPWM, the harmonics of the output waveform are at well-defined frequencies and amplitudes. This simplifies the design of the filtering components needed for the low-order current harmonic injection from the operation of the inverter. The maximum output amplitude in this mode of operation is half of the source voltage. If the maximum output amplitude, m_{a}, exceeds 3.24, the output waveform of the inverter becomes a square wave.

As was true for Pulse-Width Modulation (PWM), both switches in a leg for square wave modulation cannot be turned on at the same time, as this would cause a short across the voltage source. The switching scheme requires that both S+ and S− be on for a half cycle of the AC output period. The fundamental AC output amplitude is equal to v_{o1} = v_{aN} = 2v_{i}/π .

Its harmonics have an amplitude of v_{oh} = v_{o1}/h.

Therefore, the AC output voltage is not controlled by the inverter, but rather by the magnitude of the DC input voltage of the inverter.

Using selective harmonic elimination (SHE) as a modulation technique allows the switching of the inverter to selectively eliminate intrinsic harmonics. The fundamental component of the AC output voltage can also be adjusted within a desirable range. Since the AC output voltage obtained from this modulation technique has odd half and odd quarter-wave symmetry, even harmonics do not exist. Any undesirable odd (N-1) intrinsic harmonics from the output waveform can be eliminated.

=== Single-phase full-bridge inverter ===
FIGURE 3: Single-phase voltage source full-bridge inverter

FIGURE 4: Carrier and modulating signals for the bipolar pulsewidth modulation technique

The full-bridge inverter is similar to the half bridge-inverter, but it has an additional leg to connect the neutral point to the load. Figure 3 shows the circuit schematic of the single-phase voltage source full-bridge inverter.

To avoid shorting out the voltage source, S1+, and S1− cannot be on at the same time, and S2+ and S2− also cannot be on at the same time. Any modulating technique used for the full-bridge configuration should have either the top or the bottom switch of each leg on at any given time. Due to the extra leg, the maximum amplitude of the output waveform is Vi, and is twice as large as the maximum achievable output amplitude for the half-bridge configuration.

States 1 and 2 from Table 2 are used to generate the AC output voltage with bipolar SPWM. The AC output voltage can take on only two values, either Vi or −Vi. To generate these same states using a half-bridge configuration, a carrier based technique can be used. S+ being on for the half-bridge corresponds to S1+ and S2− being on for the full-bridge. Similarly, S− being on for the half-bridge corresponds to S1− and S2+ being on for the full bridge. The output voltage for this modulation technique is more or less sinusoidal, with a fundamental component that has an amplitude in the linear region of less than or equal to one v_{o1} =v_{ab1}= v_{i} • m_{a}.

Unlike the bipolar PWM technique, the unipolar approach uses states 1, 2, 3, and 4 from Table 2 to generate its AC output voltage. Therefore, the AC output voltage can take on the values Vi, 0 or −V [1]i. To generate these states, two sinusoidal modulating signals, Vc and −Vc, are needed, as seen in Figure 4.

Vc is used to generate VaN, while –Vc is used to generate VbN. The following relationship is called unipolar carrier-based SPWM v_{o1} =2 • v_{aN1}= v_{i} • m_{a}.

The phase voltages VaN and VbN are identical, but 180 degrees out of phase with each other. The output voltage is equal to the difference of the two-phase voltages, and do not contain any even harmonics. Therefore, if mf is taken, even the AC output voltage harmonics will appear at normalized odd frequencies, fh. These frequencies are centered on double the value of the normalized carrier frequency. This particular feature allows for smaller filtering components when trying to obtain a higher quality output waveform.

As was the case for the half-bridge SHE, the AC output voltage contains no even harmonics due to its odd half and odd quarter-wave symmetry.

=== Three-phase voltage source inverter ===
FIGURE 5: Three-phase voltage source inverter circuit schematic

FIGURE 6: Three-phase square-wave operation a) Switch state S1 b) Switch state S3 c) S1 output d) S3 output

Single-phase VSIs are used primarily for low power range applications, while three-phase VSIs cover both medium and high power range applications. Figure 5 shows the circuit schematic for a three-phase VSI.

Switches in any of the three legs of the inverter cannot be switched off simultaneously due to this resulting in the voltages being dependent on the respective line current's polarity. States 7 and 8 produce zero AC line voltages, which result in AC line currents freewheeling through either the upper or the lower components. However, the line voltages for states 1 through 6 produce an AC line voltage consisting of the discrete values of Vi, 0 or −Vi.

For three-phase SPWM, three modulating signals that are 120 degrees out of phase with one another are used in order to produce out-of-phase load voltages. In order to preserve the PWM features with a single carrier signal, the normalized carrier frequency, mf, needs to be a multiple of three. This keeps the magnitude of the phase voltages identical, but out of phase with each other by 120 degrees. The maximum achievable phase voltage amplitude in the linear region, ma less than or equal to one, is v_{phase} = v_{i} / 2. The maximum achievable line voltage amplitude is V_{ab1} = v_{ab} • √3 / 2

The only way to control the load voltage is by changing the input DC voltage.

=== Current source inverters ===
FIGURE 7: Three-phase current source inverter

Figure 8: Synchronized-pulse-width-modulation waveforms for a three-phase current source inverter a) Carrier and modulating Ssgnals b) S1 state c) S3 state d) Output current

Figure 9: Space-vector representation in current source inverters

Current source inverters convert DC current into an AC current waveform. In applications requiring sinusoidal AC waveforms, magnitude, frequency, and phase should all be controlled. CSIs have high changes in current over time, so capacitors are commonly employed on the AC side, while inductors are commonly employed on the DC side. Due to the absence of freewheeling diodes, the power circuit is reduced in size and weight, and tends to be more reliable than VSIs. Although single-phase topologies are possible, three-phase CSIs are more practical.

In its most generalized form, a three-phase CSI employs the same conduction sequence as a six-pulse rectifier. At any time, only one common-cathode switch and one common-anode switch are on.

As a result, line currents take discrete values of −ii, 0 and ii. States are chosen such that a desired waveform is output and only valid states are used. This selection is based on modulating techniques, which include carrier-based PWM, selective harmonic elimination, and space-vector techniques.

Carrier-based techniques used for VSIs can also be implemented for CSIs, resulting in CSI line currents that behave in the same way as VSI line voltages. The digital circuit utilized for modulating signals contains a switching pulse generator, a shorting pulse generator, a shorting pulse distributor, and a switching and shorting pulse combiner. A gating signal is produced based on a carrier current and three modulating signals.

A shorting pulse is added to this signal when no top switches and no bottom switches are gated, causing the RMS currents to be equal in all legs. The same methods are utilized for each phase, however, switching variables are 120 degrees out of phase relative to one another, and the current pulses are shifted by a half-cycle with respect to output currents. If a triangular carrier is used with sinusoidal modulating signals, the CSI is said to be utilizing synchronized-pulse-width-modulation (SPWM). If full over-modulation is used in conjunction with SPWM the inverter is said to be in square-wave operation.

The second CSI modulation category, SHE is also similar to its VSI counterpart. Utilizing the gating signals developed for a VSI and a set of synchronizing sinusoidal current signals, results in symmetrically distributed shorting pulses and, therefore, symmetrical gating patterns. This allows any arbitrary number of harmonics to be eliminated. It also allows control of the fundamental line current through the proper selection of primary switching angles. Optimal switching patterns must have quarter-wave and half-wave symmetry, as well as symmetry about 30 degrees and 150 degrees. Switching patterns are never allowed between 60 degrees and 120 degrees. The current ripple can be further reduced with the use of larger output capacitors, or by increasing the number of switching pulses.

The third category, space-vector-based modulation, generates PWM load line currents that equal load line currents, on average. Valid switching states and time selections are made digitally based on space vector transformation. Modulating signals are represented as a complex vector using a transformation equation. For balanced three-phase sinusoidal signals, this vector becomes a fixed module, which rotates at a frequency, ω. These space vectors are then used to approximate the modulating signal. If the signal is between arbitrary vectors, the vectors are combined with the zero vectors I7, I8, or I9. The following equations are used to ensure that the generated currents and the current vectors are on the average equivalent.

=== Multilevel inverters ===
FIGURE 10: Three-level neutral-clamped inverter

A relatively new class called multilevel inverters has gained widespread interest. Normal operation of CSIs and VSIs can be classified as two-level inverters because the power switches connect to either the positive or the negative DC bus. If more than two voltage levels were available to the inverter output terminals, the AC output could better approximate a sine wave. For this reason multilevel inverters, although more complex and costly, offer higher performance. A three-level neutral-clamped inverter is shown in Figure 10.

Control methods for a three-level inverter only allow two switches of the four switches in each leg to simultaneously change conduction states. This allows smooth commutation and avoids shoot through by only selecting valid states. It may also be noted that since the DC bus voltage is shared by at least two power valves, their voltage ratings can be less than a two-level counterpart.

Carrier-based and space-vector modulation techniques are used for multilevel topologies. The methods for these techniques follow those of classic inverters, but with added complexity. Space-vector modulation offers a greater number of fixed voltage vectors to be used in approximating the modulation signal, and therefore allows more effective space vector PWM strategies to be accomplished at the cost of more elaborate algorithms. Due to added complexity and the number of semiconductor devices, multilevel inverters are currently more suitable for high-power high-voltage applications. This technology reduces the harmonics hence improves overall efficiency of the scheme.

== AC/AC converters ==
Converting AC power to AC power allows control of the voltage, frequency, and phase of the waveform applied to a load from a supplied AC system. The two main categories that can be used to separate the types of converters are whether the frequency of the waveform is changed. AC/AC converter that don't allow the user to modify the frequencies are known as AC Voltage Controllers, or AC Regulators. AC converters that allow the user to change the frequency are simply referred to as frequency converters for AC-to-AC conversion. Under frequency converters there are three different types of converters that are typically used: cycloconverter, matrix converter, DC-link converter (a.k.a. AC/DC/AC converter).

AC voltage controller: The purpose of an AC Voltage Controller, or AC Regulator, is to vary the RMS voltage across the load while at a constant frequency. Three control methods that are generally accepted are ON/OFF Control, Phase-Angle Control, and Pulse-Width Modulation AC Chopper Control (PWM AC Chopper Control). All three of these methods can be implemented not only in single-phase circuits, but three-phase circuits as well.

- ON/OFF Control: Typically used for heating loads or speed control of motors, this control method involves turning the switch on for n integral cycles and turning the switch off for m integral cycles. Because turning the switches on and off causes undesirable harmonics to be created, the switches are turned on and off during zero-voltage and zero-current conditions (zero-crossing), effectively reducing the distortion.
- Phase-Angle Control: Various circuits exist to implement a phase-angle control on different waveforms, such as half-wave or full-wave voltage control. The power electronic components that are typically used are diodes, SCRs, and Triacs. With the use of these components, the user can delay the firing angle in a wave, which will only cause part of the wave to be in output.
- PWM AC Chopper Control: The other two control methods often have poor harmonics, output current quality, and input power factor. In order to improve these values PWM can be used instead of the other methods. What PWM AC Chopper does is have switches that turn on and off several times within alternate half-cycles of input voltage.

Matrix converters and cycloconverters: Cycloconverters are widely used in industry for AC-to-AC conversion, because they are able to be used in high-power applications. They are commutated direct frequency converters that are synchronised by a supply line. The cycloconverters output voltage waveforms have complex harmonics with the higher-order harmonics being filtered by the machine inductance. Causing the machine current to have fewer harmonics, while the remaining harmonics causes losses and torque pulsations. Note that in a cycloconverter, unlike other converters, there are no inductors or capacitors, i.e. no storage devices. For this reason, the instantaneous input power and the output power are equal.

- Single-Phase to Single-Phase Cycloconverters: Single-Phase to Single-Phase Cycloconverters started drawing more interest recently because of the decrease in both size and price of the power electronics switches. The single-phase high-frequency AC voltage can be either sinusoidal or trapezoidal. These might be zero voltage intervals for control purpose or zero voltage commutation.
- Three-Phase to Single-Phase Cycloconverters: There are two kinds of three-phase to single-phase cycloconverters: 3φ to 1φ half wave cycloconverters and 3φ to 1φ bridge cycloconverters. Both positive and negative converters can generate voltage at either polarity, resulting in the positive converter only supplying positive current, and the negative converter only supplying negative current.

With recent device advances, newer forms of cycloconverters are being developed, such as matrix converters. The first change that is first noticed is that matrix converters utilize bi-directional, bipolar switches. A single phase to a single phase matrix converter consists of a matrix of 9 switches connecting the three input phases to the tree output phase. Any input phase and output phase can be connected together at any time without connecting any two switches from the same phase at the same time; otherwise this will cause a short circuit of the input phases. Matrix converters are lighter, more compact and versatile than other converter solutions. As a result, they are able to achieve higher levels of integration, higher temperature operation, broad output frequency and natural bi-directional power flow suitable to regenerate energy back to the utility.

The matrix converters are subdivided into two types: direct and indirect converters. A direct matrix converter with three-phase input and three-phase output, the switches in a matrix converter must be bi-directional, that is, they must be able to block voltages of either polarity and to conduct current in either direction. This switching strategy permits the highest possible output voltage and reduces the reactive line-side current. Therefore, the power flow through the converter is reversible. Because of its commutation problem and complex control keep it from being broadly utilized in industry.

Unlike the direct matrix converters, the indirect matrix converters has the same functionality, but uses separate input and output sections that are connected through a DC link without storage elements. The design includes a four-quadrant current source rectifier and a voltage source inverter. The input section consists of bi-directional bipolar switches. The commutation strategy can be applied by changing the switching state of the input section while the output section is in a freewheeling mode. This commutation algorithm is significantly less complex, and has higher reliability as compared to a conventional direct matrix converter.

DC link converters: DC Link Converters, also referred to as AC/DC/AC converters, convert an AC input to an AC output with the use of a DC link in the middle. Meaning that the power in the converter is converted to DC from AC with the use of a rectifier, and then it is converted back to AC from DC with the use of an inverter. The end result is an output with a lower voltage and variable (higher or lower) frequency. Due to their wide area of application, the AC/DC/AC converters are the most common contemporary solution. Other advantages to AC/DC/AC converters is that they are stable in overload and no-load conditions, as well as they can be disengaged from a load without damage.

Hybrid matrix converter: Hybrid matrix converters are relatively new for AC/AC converters. These converters combine the AC/DC/AC design with the matrix converter design. Multiple types of hybrid converters have been developed in this new category, an example being a converter that uses uni-directional switches and two converter stages without the DC-link; without the capacitors or inductors needed for a DC-link, the weight and size of the converter is reduced. Two sub-categories exist from the hybrid converters, named hybrid direct matrix converter (HDMC) and hybrid indirect matrix converter (HIMC). HDMC convert the voltage and current in one stage, while the HIMC utilizes separate stages, like the AC/DC/AC converter, but without the use of an intermediate storage element.

Applications: Below is a list of common applications that each converter is used in.

- AC voltage controller: Lighting control; domestic and industrial heating; speed control of fan, pump or hoist drives, soft starting of induction motors, static AC switches (temperature control, transformer tap changing, etc.)
- Cycloconverter: High-power low-speed reversible AC motor drives; constant frequency power supply with variable input frequency; controllable VAR generators for power factor correction; AC system interties linking two independent power systems.
- Matrix converter: Currently the application of matrix converters are limited due to the non-availability of bilateral monolithic switches capable of operating at high frequency, complex control law implementation, commutation, and other reasons. With these developments, matrix converters could replace cycloconverters in many areas.
- DC link: Can be used for individual or multiple load applications of machine building and construction.

== Simulations of power electronic systems ==
Output voltage of a full-wave rectifier with controlled thyristors

Power electronic circuits are simulated using computer simulation programs such as SIMBA, PLECS, PSIM, SPICE, MATLAB/simulink, and OpenModelica. Circuits are simulated before they are produced to test how the circuits respond under certain conditions. Also, creating a simulation is both cheaper and faster than creating a prototype to use for testing.

== Applications ==
Applications of power electronics range in size from a switched-mode power supply in an AC adapter, battery chargers, audio amplifiers, fluorescent lamp ballasts, through variable-frequency drives and DC motor drives used to operate pumps, fans, and manufacturing machinery, up to gigawatt-scale high voltage direct current power transmission systems used to interconnect electrical grids. Power electronic systems are found in virtually every electronic device. For example:

- DC/DC converters are used in most mobile devices (mobile phones, PDA etc.) to maintain the voltage at a fixed value whatever the voltage level of the battery is. These converters are also used for electronic isolation and power factor correction. A power optimizer is a type of DC/DC converter developed to maximize the energy harvest from solar photovoltaic or wind turbine systems.
- AC/DC converters (rectifiers) are used every time an electronic device is connected to the mains (computer, television etc.). These may simply change AC to DC or can also change the voltage level as part of their operation.
- AC/AC converters are used to change either the voltage level or the frequency (international power adapters, light dimmer). In power distribution networks, AC/AC converters may be used to exchange power between utility frequency 50 Hz and 60 Hz power grids.
- DC/AC converters (inverters) are used primarily in UPS or renewable energy systems or emergency lighting systems. Mains power charges the DC battery. If the mains fails, an inverter produces AC electricity at mains voltage from the DC battery. Solar inverter, both smaller string and larger central inverters, as well as solar micro-inverter are used in photovoltaics as a component of a PV system.

Motor drives are found in pumps, blowers, and mill drives for textile, paper, cement and other such facilities. Drives may be used for power conversion and for motion control. For AC motors, applications include variable-frequency drives, motor soft starters and excitation systems.

In hybrid electric vehicles (HEVs), power electronics are used in two formats: series hybrid and parallel hybrid. The difference between a series hybrid and a parallel hybrid is the relationship of the electric motor to the internal combustion engine (ICE). Devices used in electric vehicles consist mostly of DC/DC converters for battery charging and DC/AC converters to power the propulsion motor. Electric trains use power electronic devices to obtain power, as well as for vector control using pulse-width modulation (PWM) rectifiers. The trains obtain their power from power lines. Another new usage for power electronics is in elevator systems. These systems may use thyristors, inverters, permanent magnet motors, or various hybrid systems that incorporate PWM systems and standard motors.

=== Inverters ===
In general, inverters are utilized in applications requiring direct conversion of electrical energy from DC to AC or indirect conversion from AC to AC. DC-to-AC conversion is useful for many fields, including power conditioning, harmonic compensation, motor drives, renewable energy grid integration, and spacecraft solar power systems.

In power systems it is often desired to eliminate harmonic content found in line currents. VSIs can be used as active power filters to provide this compensation. Based on measured line currents and voltages, a control system determines reference current signals for each phase. This is fed back through an outer loop and subtracted from actual current signals to create current signals for an inner loop to the inverter. These signals then cause the inverter to generate output currents that compensate for the harmonic content. This configuration requires no real power consumption, as it is fully fed by the line; the DC link is simply a capacitor that is kept at a constant voltage by the control system. In this configuration, output currents are in phase with line voltages to produce a unity power factor. Conversely, VAR compensation is possible in a similar configuration where output currents lead line voltages to improve the overall power factor.

In facilities that require energy at all times, such as hospitals and airports, UPS systems are utilized. In a standby system, an inverter is brought online when the normally supplying grid is interrupted. Power is instantaneously drawn from onsite batteries and converted into usable AC voltage by the VSI, until grid power is restored, or until backup generators are brought online. In an online UPS system, a rectifier-DC-link-inverter is used to protect the load from transients and harmonic content. A battery in parallel with the DC link is kept fully charged by the output in case the grid power is interrupted, while the output of the inverter is fed through a low-pass filter to the load. High power quality and independence from disturbances is achieved.

Various AC motor drives have been developed for speed, torque, and position control of AC motors. These drives can be categorized as low-performance or as high-performance, based on whether they are scalar-controlled or vector-controlled, respectively. In scalar-controlled drives, fundamental stator current, or voltage frequency and amplitude, are the only controllable quantities. Therefore, these drives are employed in applications where high quality control is not required, such as fans and compressors. On the other hand, vector-controlled drives allow for instantaneous current and voltage values to be controlled continuously. This high performance is necessary for applications such as elevators and electric cars.

Inverters are also vital to many renewable energy applications. In photovoltaic purposes, the inverter, which is usually a PWM VSI, gets fed by the DC electrical energy output of a photovoltaic module or array. The inverter then converts this into an AC voltage to be interfaced with either a load or the utility grid. Inverters may also be employed in other renewable systems, such as wind turbines. In these applications, the turbine speed usually varies, causing changes in voltage frequency and sometimes in the magnitude. In this case, the generated voltage can be rectified and then inverted to stabilize frequency and magnitude.

=== Smart grid ===
A smart grid is a modernized electrical grid that uses information and communications technology to gather and act on information, such as information about the behaviors of suppliers and consumers, in an automated fashion to improve the efficiency, reliability, economics, and sustainability of the production and distribution of electricity.

Electric power generated by wind turbines and hydroelectric turbines by using induction generators can cause variances in the frequency at which power is generated. Power electronic devices are utilized in these systems to convert the generated AC voltages into high-voltage direct current (HVDC). The HVDC power can be more easily converted into three-phase power that is coherent with the power associated to the existing power grid. Through these devices, the power delivered by these systems is cleaner and has a higher associated power factor. Wind power systems optimum torque is obtained either through a gearbox or direct drive technologies that can reduce the size of the power electronics device.

Electric power can be generated through photovoltaic cells by using power electronic devices. The produced power is usually then transformed by solar inverters. Inverters are divided into three different types: central, module-integrated, and string. Central converters can be connected either in parallel or in series on the DC side of the system. For photovoltaic "farms", a single central converter is used for the entire system. Module-integrated converters are connected in series on either the DC or AC side. Normally several modules are used within a photovoltaic system, since the system requires these converters on both DC and AC terminals. A string converter is used in a system that utilizes photovoltaic cells that are facing different directions. It is used to convert the power generated to each string, or line, in which the photovoltaic cells are interacting.

Power electronics can be used to help utilities adapt to the rapid increase in distributed residential/commercial solar power generation. Germany and parts of Hawaii, California, and New Jersey require costly studies to be conducted before approving new solar installations. Relatively small-scale ground- or pole-mounted devices create the potential for a distributed control infrastructure to monitor and manage the flow of power. Traditional electromechanical systems, such as capacitor banks or voltage regulators at substations, can take minutes to adjust voltage and can be distant from the solar installations where the problems originate. If voltage on a neighborhood circuit goes too high, it can endanger utility crews and cause damage to both utility and customer equipment. Further, a grid fault causes photovoltaic generators to shut down immediately, spiking the demand for grid power. Smart grid-based regulators are more controllable than far more numerous consumer devices.

In another approach, a group of 16 western utilities called the Western Electric Industry Leaders called for the mandatory use of "smart inverters." These devices convert DC to household AC and can also help with power quality. Such devices could eliminate the need for expensive utility equipment upgrades at a much lower total cost.

== See also ==
- Multi-port power electronic interface
- FET amplifier
- Power management integrated circuit
- RF power amplifier
