= Alex Lidow =

American inventor

- Education: Caltech; Stanford University
- Occupations: CEO and co-founder of Efficient Power Conversion (EPC)

Alex Lidow is CEO and co-founder of Efficient Power Conversion (EPC), former CEO of International Rectifier and is the co-inventor of the HEXFET power MOSFET, a power transistor. Lidow is co-author of the book GaN Transistors for Efficient Power Conversion (2012, Wiley). He has authored numerous peer reviewed publications on related subjects, and received the 2015 SEMI Award for North America for the commercialization of more efficient power devices. Lidow was one of the lead representatives of the Semiconductor Industry Association (SIA) for the trade negotiations that resulted in the U.S. – Japan Trade Accord of 1986 and testified to Congress on multiple occasions on behalf of the industry.

A co-inventor of the HEXFET(R) power MOSFET, Lidow holds 21 patents on power semiconductor technology.

== Career ==
In 1977 Lidow began a 30-year career at International Rectifier (IR), founded by his grandfather and his father Eric Lidow (CEO at the time) in 1947, as an R&D engineer. Lidow became Vice President of R&D at International Rectifier in 1979, and was subsequently appointed head of manufacturing, head of sales and marketing. Lidow was elected to the Board of Directors in 1994. In March 1995, Lidow replaced his father as the Chief Executive Officer, serving alongside his brother Derek Lidow, who departed International Rectifier and founded market research firm iSuppli in 1999. Under Lidow’s leadership, International Rectifier was named one of the best managed companies in America by Forbes magazine in 2005. Lidow would remain on as CEO at International Rectifier until October 2007. After leaving International Rectifier, Lidow founded Efficient Power Conversion (EPC) in 2007, an American technology company that designs and manufactures gallium nitride (GaN) semiconductors, which it sells to electronics designers and manufacturers globally. Lidow and International Rectifier filed opposing lawsuits over his termination from IR, which were settled out of court in 2013. Lidow published contributions to the electronics industry range from multiple technology patents to the co-inventing of the HEXFET power MOSFET. Lidow co-authored the book GaN Transistors for Efficient Power Conversion in 2012. In addition, his writing has been published in numerous blogs and publications, both online and off.

== Education ==
Lidow holds degrees from Caltech and Stanford. He received his Bachelor of Science in Applied Physics from Caltech in 1975, and a Ph.D. in applied physics from Stanford University in 1977 as a Hertz Foundation Fellow.

== Boards ==
- Board of Trustees of the California Institute of Technology
- Chairman of the Compensation and Nominating Committees, and Vice Chair of the Investment Committee for the California Institute of Technology
- Board of Overseers for the RAND Corp.
