= Derek Lidow =

Derek Lidow is a professor of practice at Princeton University, author, speaker, entrepreneur, former CEO and founder of iSuppli, and former CEO of International Rectifier. Lidow is author of three books: Startup Leadership: How Savvy Entrepreneurs Turn Their Ideas Into Successful Enterprises (2014, Wiley), What Sam Walton, Walt Disney, and Other Great Self-Made Entrepreneurs Can Teach Us About Building Valuable Companies (2018, Diversion), and THE ENTREPRENEURS: The Relentless Quest for Value (2022, Columbia University Press). He is also a media commentator; Lidow's coverage to date includes The New York Times, Wall Street Journal, BusinessWeek, Forbes, Bloomberg, The Economist, Nikkei, Reuters, and Taipei Times as well as many top bloggers.

Lidow's book, articles and speeches cover topics on innovation, entrepreneurship, startups, leadership and creativity. He joined Princeton university's Keller Center as the James Wei Visiting Professor in Entrepreneurship for the academic year 2011–2012. At Princeton he has created four novel classes: "Entrepreneurial Leadership," "Creativity, Innovation, and Design," "The History of Entrepreneurship" and "Creating Value in the Real World." The Academy of Management awarded professor Lidow its 2025 Distinguished Educator Award.

== Early years ==
Lidow holds degrees from Princeton and Stanford. He received his BSE summa cum laude from Princeton University in 1973, and a PhD in applied physics as a Hertz Foundation Fellow at Stanford University in 1976. Lidow's PhD thesis identified a new type of atomic interaction in the presence of intense beams of light.

In 1977 Lidow began a 22-year career at International Rectifier, founded by his grandfather and his father Eric Lidow (CEO at the time) in 1947, as a Production Engineer. He then served as Vice President of Operations, and was promoted in 1985 to Executive Vice President for Marketing and Administration. Lidow became President of International Rectifier's Power Products Division in 1989, and was elected to the board of directors in 1994. In March 1995, Mr. Lidow replaced his father as the chief executive officer, serving alongside his brother Alex Lidow who remained CEO until 2007.

== Career ==
After leaving International Rectifier, Lidow founded iSuppli in 1999, a market research firm sold to global information company IHS in 2010 for $95 million. Lidow was also a member of the board of directors for United Silicon Carbide Inc., a technology company. Lidow is widely cited as an expert on the electronics industry. His contributions range from multiple technology patents to supply chain applications used by companies like Sony, Samsung, Philips, Goldman Sachs and IBM.

Today, Lidow is a professor of practice at Princeton, where he teaches and publishes on leadership, innovation, entrepreneurship, and the history of entrepreneurship. He has created four unique courses for Princeton's Keller Center: "Entrepreneurial Leadership," "Creativity, Innovation and Design," "The History of Entrepreneurship" and "Creating Value in the Real World." His "Creativity, Innovation and Design" and "The History of Entrepreneurship" both received the Academy of Management's Entrepreneurship Division's Innovation in Pedagogy Award, in 2019 and 2023 respectfully.

=== Author ===
Lidow is author of the book Startup Leadership: How Savvy Entrepreneurs Turn Their Ideas Into Successful Enterprises. In addition, his writing has been published in numerous blogs and publications, both online and off. He is also author of Building on Bedrock: What Sam Walton, Walt Disney, and Other Great Self-Made Entrepreneurs Can Teach Us About Building Valuable Companies. His most recent book is THE ENTREPRENEURS: The Relentless Quest for Value (2022, Columbia University Press). THE ENTREPRENEURS was a finalist for the Academy of Management's 2023 George R. Terry book award.

=== Scholar ===
Lidow has extensively researched the emergence of entrepreneurial behavior is various cultures around the world. His article, Prehistoric entrepreneurs: rethinking the definition, and book, THE ENTREPRENEURS, trace entrepreneurial behavior back to hunter-gatherers groups living 9,000 years ago. The emergence of entrepreneurs before any social or political hierarchies has forced a reexamination of what is an entrepreneur and what part they played in shaping the societies of the world.

=== Boards ===
- Board of Directors of iSuppli Corporation, 1999 – 2011
- Board of Directors of International Rectifier Corporation (NYSE: IRF), circa 1991 – 2000
- Board of Trustees of the Los Angeles Philharmonic, circa 1994 – 1999
- Princeton University Department of Electrical Engineering Advisory Council, circa 1975 – circa 1996
- Princeton University School of Engineering and Applied Science Leadership Council, circa 1997 – 2011
- United Silicon Carbide, 2012–2021

=== Awards ===
- Hertz Fellow, 1973-1976
- Computerworld Smithsonian Finalist, 1994
- Academy of Management Entrepreneurship Division, Innovation in Pedagogy Award, 2019 and 2023
- Academy of Management George R. Terry Award Finalist, 2023
- Academy of Management Distinguished Educator Award, 2025
