= VMOS =

Type of semiconductor

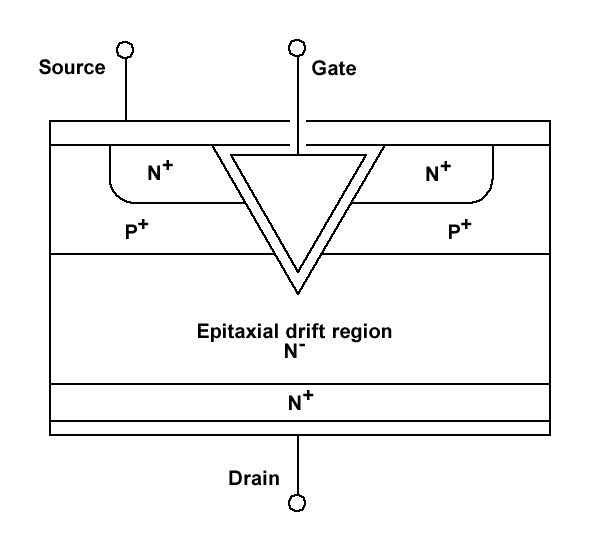
The VMOS structure has a V-groove at the gate region

A VMOS (/ˈviːmɒs/) (vertical metal oxide semiconductor or V-groove MOS) transistor is a type of metal–oxide–semiconductor field-effect transistor (MOSFET). VMOS is also used to describe the V-groove shape vertically cut into the substrate material.

The "V" shape of the MOSFET's gate allows the device to deliver a higher amount of current from the source to the drain of the device. The shape of the depletion region creates a wider channel, allowing more current to flow through it.

During operation in blocking mode, the highest electric field occurs at the N^{+}/p^{+} junction. The presence of a sharp corner at the bottom of the groove enhances the electric field at the edge of the channel in the depletion region, thus reducing the breakdown voltage of the device. This electric field launches electrons into the gate oxide and consequently, the trapped electrons shift the threshold voltage of the MOSFET. For this reason, the V-groove architecture is no longer used in commercial devices.

The device's use was a power device until more suitable geometries, like the UMOS (or Trench-Gate MOS) were introduced in order to lower the maximum electric field at the top of the V shape and thus leading to higher maximum voltages than in case of the VMOS.

== History ==
The MOSFET was invented at Bell Labs between 1955 and 1960. The V-groove construction was pioneered by Jun-ichi Nishizawa in 1969, initially for the static induction transistor (SIT), a type of junction field-effect transistor (JFET).

The VMOS was invented by Hitachi in 1969, when they introduced the first vertical power MOSFET in Japan. T. J. Rodgers, while he was a student at Stanford University, filed a US patent for a VMOS in 1973. Siliconix commercially introduced a VMOS in 1975. The VMOS later developed into what became known as the vertical DMOS (VDMOS).

In 1978, American Microsystems (AMI) released the S2811. It was the first integrated circuit chip specifically designed as a digital signal processor (DSP), and was fabricated using VMOS, a technology that had previously not been mass-produced.
