= Tape-automated bonding =

Places a microchip on a flexible circuit board

Drawing of a tape-automated bonding carrier and definitions of various parts of the TAB assembly

Tape-automated bonding (TAB) is a process that places bare semiconductor chips (dies) like integrated circuits onto a flexible circuit board (FPC) by attaching them to fine conductors in a polyamide or polyimide (like trade names Kapton or UPILEX) film carrier. This FPC with the die(s) (TAB inner lead bonding, ILB) can be mounted on the system or module board or assembled inside a package (TAB outer lead bonding, OLB). Typically the FPC includes from one to three conductive layers and all inputs and outputs of the semiconductor die are connected simultaneously during the TAB bonding. Tape automated bonding is one of the methods needed for achieving chip-on-flex (COF) assembly and it is one of the first roll-to-roll processing (also called R2R, reel-to-reel) type methods in the electronics manufacturing.

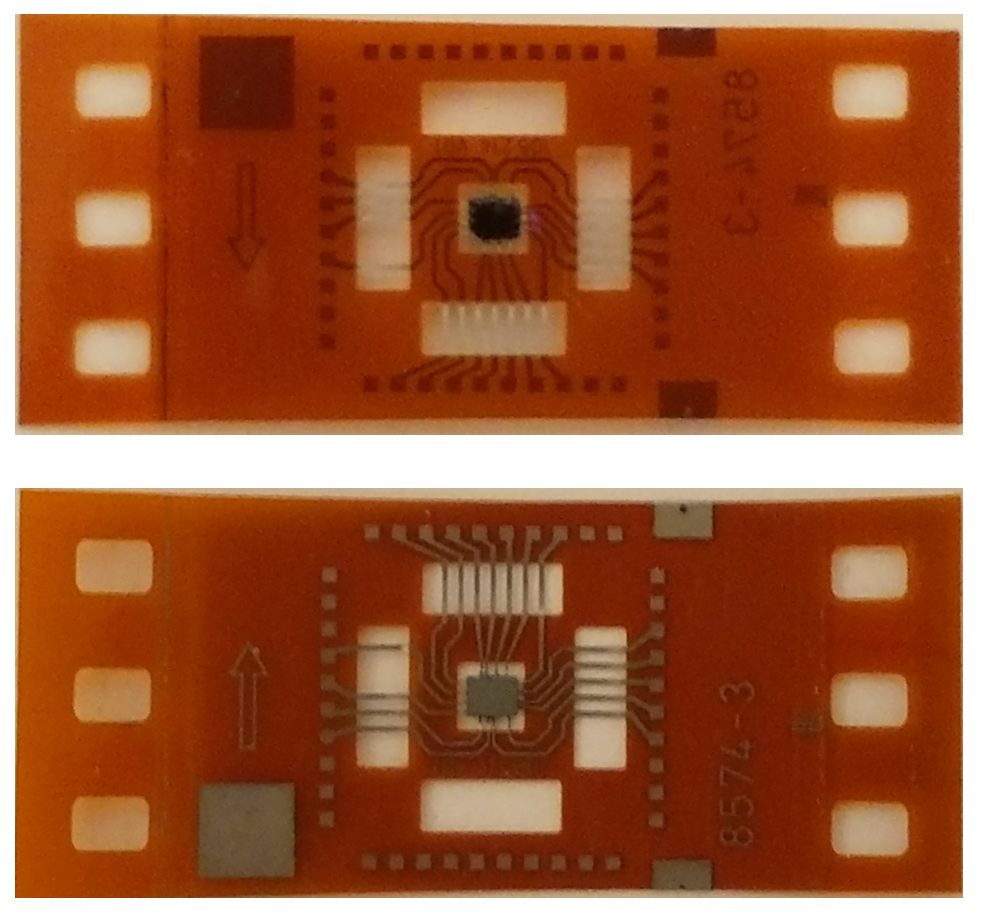
A silicon IC as tape automated bonded (TAB) realization on the 35 mm wide tape. The upper picture shows the IC front side as glob topped (in the middle seen as a black object) and the lower picture shows the backside of the same assembly.

== Process ==
The TAB mounting is done such that the bonding sites of the die, usually in the form of bumps or balls made of gold, solder or anisotropic conductive material, are connected to fine conductors on the tape, which provide the means of connecting the die to the package or directly to external circuits. The bumps or balls can locate either on the die or on the TAB tape. TAB compliant metallizations systems are:

- Al pads on the die < - > gold plated Cu on tape areas (thermosonic bonding)
- Al covered with Au on pads on the die < - > Au or Sn bumped tape areas (gang bonding)
- Al pads with Au bumps on the die < - > Au or Sn plated tape areas (gang bonding)
- Al pads with solder bumps on the die < - > Au, Sn or solder plated tape areas (gang bonding)

Sometimes the tape on which the die is bonded already contains the actual application circuit of the die. The film is moved to the target location, and the leads are cut and joining the chip takes place as necessary. There are several joining methods used with TAB: thermocompression bonding (with help of a pressure, sometimes called as a gang bonding), thermosonic bonding etc. The bare chip may then be encapsulated ("glob topped") with epoxy or similar.

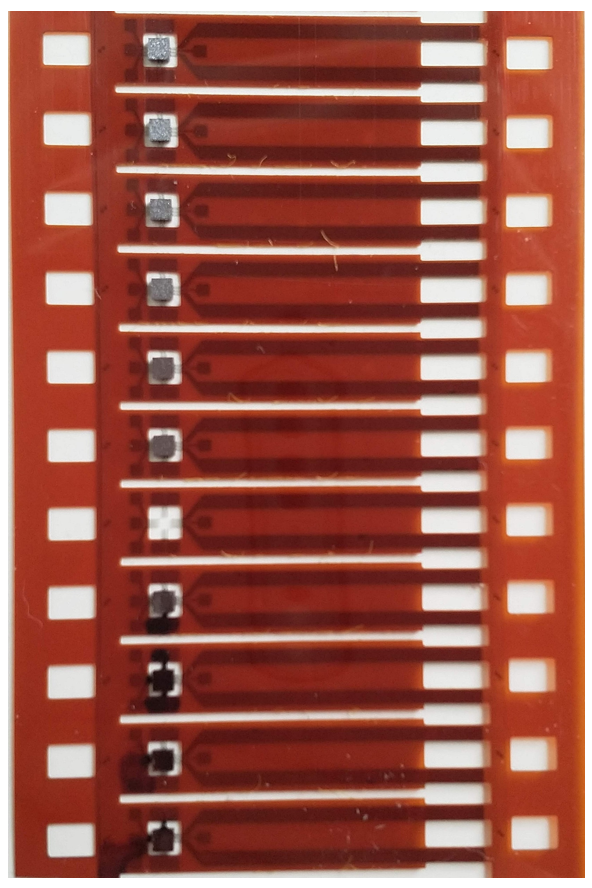
Example of a TAB tape after assembly. Chips can be located on other places than in the middle of the tape, in this case on the left hand side of the tape. Glob topped chips are visible as black, one missing and the rest without a glob top.

The merits of the tape-automated bonding are:

- All chip interconnections (inputs/outputs from/to the chip) are made during one bonding, and this differentiates TAB from the wire bonding.
- This bonding technique can be highly automated, and if needed very fast. Therefore, TAB is used in high volume electronics production.
- Produces very light and thin assembly, because of the thin substrate and minimum possible glob topping covering only the chip area. There are many applications like in sensory, in medical, space electronics, bank and credit cards, SIM cards of portable equipment like mobile phones etc. where thin assembly with small weight are beneficial.
- In some applications additional packaging possibly may not be needed and it may replace the metallic lead frame in some packaging approaches.

The challenges of the tape-automated bonding are:

- Specific machinery is needed in the manufacturing.
- Chips need to have bumps on the input/output (IO) pads or bumps need to be on the tape. The bumps and metals on the chip and on the tape must be compliant for achieving reliable in all environmental and other circumstances of the application.
- Interconnection methods – TAB and flip chip – are enabling all IOs of the chip to be interconnected at the same time. Therefore, the speed advantage of TAB has diminished with the development of the flip chip manufacturing, because flip chip uses soldering which also with the time has developed towards fine pitch interconnection method similar to TAB. Additionally speed up of the wire bonding has left TAB to be mostly applied in some specific areas like display driver interconnections and smart cards. Although TAB is a viable high speed and high density interconnection method.

== Standards ==
Standard sizes for polyimide tapes include widths of 35 mm, 45 mm, and 70 mm and thicknesses between 50 and 100 micrometers. Since the tape is in the form of a roll, the length of the circuit is measured in terms of sprocket pitches, with each sprocket pitch measuring about 4.75 mm. Thus, a circuit size of 16 pitches is about 76 mm long.

== History and background ==
Technically the process was invented by Frances Hugle – patent issued 1969 – although it was not named as TAB. The TAB was first outlined by Gerard Dehaine 1971 at Honeywell Bull. Historically, TAB was created as an alternative to wire bonding and finds common use by electronics manufacturers. However speed up of wire bonding methods and development of flip chip – enabling simultaneous bonding of all IOs of the die and easier repaire compared to TAB – have pushed TAB bonding to be used in specific areas like for interconnection of display drivers to the display like liquid crystal display (LCD).
