= Frances Hugle =

American scientist, engineer, inventor

Frances B. Hugle
- Born: Frances Betty Sarnat; August 13, 1927; Chicago, Illinois
- Died: May 24, 1968 (aged 40)
- Education: University of Chicago; University of Cincinnati
- Occupations: Scientist, engineer, inventor
- Known for: Microscopic and integrated circuitry pioneer; inventor of Tape automated bonding
- Spouse: William Bell Hugle
- Parent(s): Nathan Sarnat, Lylian Steinfeld

Frances Sarnat Hugle (August 13, 1927 – May 24, 1968) was an American scientist, engineer, and inventor who contributed to the understanding of semiconductors, integrated circuitry, and the unique electrical principles of microscopic materials. She also invented techniques, processes, and equipment for practical (high volume) fabrication of microscopic circuitry, integrated circuits, and microprocessors which are still in use today.

In 1962, Hugle co-founded Siliconix, one of Silicon Valley's first semiconductor houses. She is the only woman included in the "Semiconductor Family Tree."

== Early life and education ==
Frances Betty Sarnat (Sarnatzky) was born on August 13, 1927, in Chicago, Illinois, to Nathan Sarnat (Sarnatzky) and Lylian Steinfeld. Sarnat attended Hyde Park High School on Chicago's south side, where she participated in many of the school's science clubs, including the chemistry, physics and biology clubs. In the spring of 1944, just before her graduation, she was selected to represent Hyde Park High in Chicago's Math Contest, in which she took first place.

After graduation, Sarnat attended the University of Chicago. In 1946, at the age of eighteen, she was awarded a Bachelor of Philosophy. It was while studying here that she married fellow student, William B. Hugle, in 1947. They founded several R&D companies together.

In 1957, the University of Chicago additionally awarded her a Bachelor of Science degree in chemistry based upon the course work she had completed between 1944 and 1947.

Hugle's graduate studies in crystallography, including studies in x-ray diffraction techniques, took place at the Polytechnic Institute of Brooklyn, Brooklyn, NY.

In 1960, she received a Master of Science degree from the University of Cincinnati.

Hugle also received an honorary doctorate from a Canadian university. In the mid-1960s, she taught at Santa Clara University.

== Professional career ==
Hugle founded her first research company, Hyco Labs, in the mid-1940s and assumed the title of Director of Research. At Hyco Labs, she began the research and development of materials, processes and specialized equipment that would become the foundation of much of her future work. After marrying, the Hugles founded Stuart Laboratories, Inc. She worked at Stuart Laboratories from October 1949 until February 1951. They have four children, Margaret, Cheryl, David and Linda.

In March 1951, she went to work for Standard Electronics Research Corp., where she was cleared for "secret" work. She remained at Standard Electronics Research Corp until August 1952, and shortly thereafter obtained employment at the Baldwin Piano Company, which was looking to use transistors in their electronic organs and may have been interested in "military and industrial electronics". In 1959, both Hugle and her husband began work at Westinghouse Company in Pittsburgh. In 1960, at the request of Westinghouse, the Hugles moved to southern California to set up an astro-electronics laboratory.

In late 1961, the Hugles moved again, to the Laurelwood Subdivision in Santa Clara, in the San Francisco Bay Area, where the Hugles co-founded Siliconix in 1962. She developed Siliconix's first products and became its first Director of Research and Chief Engineer.

After leaving Siliconix in 1964, Hugle developed products for two more semiconductor companies that she co-founded with her husband. These were Stewart Warner Microcircuits, where she once again served as Director of Research and as Chief Engineer, and Hugle Industries. She got stomach cancer and died at the age of 40.

== Inventions and patents ==
Hugle was awarded at least seventeen patents, some posthumously. Amongst these, she has been credited with the invention of tape automated bonding (TAB) (a technology first put into commercial use by General Electric); and Hugle was the first person to patent flex-based packaging. She has also been identified as a pioneer in early flip chip technology. Patents include:

- US 3226271, Hugle, Frances B. & Hugle, William B., "Semi-Conductive Films and Method of Producing Them", published 1965-12-28
- US 3481801, Hugle, F. B., "Isolation Techniques for Integrated Circuits", published 1969-12-02. This patent is included in the Chip Collection displayed by the Smithsonian National Museum of American History.
- US 3574007, Hugle, Frances B., "Method of Manufacturing Improved MIS Transistor Arrays"
