= Multi-port power electronic interface =

Within the electronics industry, a Multi-port Power Electronic Interface (MPEI) is a self-sustainable multiple input/output static power electronic converter. It is capable of interfacing with different sources, storages, and loads. The integrated control system of MPEI enables excellent dynamic and steady state performance, which renders optimal renewable energy harvesting, optimal energy management, and optimal and economical utility grid interactions in a deregulated power market.
