= Siliconix =

Defunct American semiconductor company

Vishay Siliconix
- Formerly: Siliconix Inc.
- Company type: Public
- Industry: Semiconductor
- Founded: March 5, 1962; 64 years ago
- Founder: Frances Hugle; Bill Hugle; Richard Lee
- Defunct: 2005
- Fate: acquired by Vishay Intertechnology
- Headquarters: Sunnyvale, California

Siliconix Inc., later Temic Siliconix Inc. was a pioneering American semiconductor company known for its MOSFET designs. Now a subsidiary brand of Vishay, it was founded by Frances and Bill Hugle in 1962.

== History ==
Siliconix was incorporated on March 5, 1962, by husband and wife Frances and Bill Hugle and Richard Lee. The Hugles were well known in the semiconductor industry for the works at previous companies that specialized in optical encoding and circuit production, including at the Baldwin Piano Company of Cincinnati, Ohio where Frances invented the integrated circuit. (US 3226271, Hugle, Frances B. & William B. Hugle, "Semi-Conductive Films and Method of Producing Them", published March 29, 1956, issued December 28, 1965) Baldwin later gave the Hugles the capital to raise Siliconix in 1962 based upon her numerous inventions during her time working there including and possibly especially her invention of the integrated circuit. Startup capital was also contributed by the Electronic Engineering Company (EECO) of Santa Ana, California. Lee, meanwhile, had previously worked at Texas Instruments before being appointed Vice President and General Manager at Siliconix. At Siliconix, Frances Hugle, the Director of Research and Chief Engineer focused on the field-effect transistor (FET) design and manufacturing while most other companies were still using bipolar junction transistor (BJT) designs. First products of the company were P-channel junction FETs, N-channel junction FETs, MOSFETs, FET arrays, and power MOSFETs.

The Hugles went on to found a number of other electronics companies following their exodus from Siliconix. The exodus came about after Bill Hugle was fired only a year or two after the founding due to conflicts with Lee. And then Frances too was fired with the excuse that she might act as a spy for her husband. Frances Hugle died on May 24, 1968, following a six-month-long illness.. Lee remained principally responsible for Siliconix's day-to-day operations until the mid-1980s, when he expanded the company's executive leadership. Bill Hugle ran for Democratic nomination in 1972 for the 16th district but lost. He was later charged by the Federal Bureau of Investigation (FBI) in 1983 of committing espionage in collaboration with a spy for the Polish People's Republic in the early 1970s. A grand jury found Hugle not guilty in 1984. He died in 2003.

Throughout the 1980s, Siliconix coasted on the success of its original FET designs, as well as custom application-specific integrated circuits (ASICs), shirking off developing microprocessors and microcontrollers as many other semiconductor pioneers had attempted and either found success or went bankrupt. Through to at least 1985, Siliconix never reported a single quarterly loss. By the late 1980s, however, sales began to flounder, and a patent infringement suit lost against International Rectifier forced Siliconix to file for Chapter 11 bankruptcy in 1989. They were acquired by TEMIC, a business unit of the German Telefunken company, who renamed the company Temic Siliconix Inc., who pivoted the company toward power management ICs for microcomputers and motion controller chips for hard disk drive controller boards.

In 1997, Vishay started to buy Siliconix stock from various shareholders and practically completed the acquisition of the entire company by 2005.
