= MOS-controlled thyristor =

Type of thyristor

Equivalent circuit of an MCT

An MOS-controlled thyristor (MCT) is a voltage-controlled fully controllable thyristor, controlled by MOSFETs (metal–oxide–semiconductor field-effect transistors). It was invented by V.A.K. Temple in 1984, and was principally similar to the earlier insulated-gate bipolar transistor (IGBT). MCTs are similar in operation to GTO thyristors, but have voltage controlled insulated gates. They have two MOSFETs of opposite conductivity types in their equivalent circuits. One is responsible for turn-on and the other for turn-off. A thyristor with only one MOSFET in its equivalent circuit, which can only be turned on (like normal SCRs), is called an MOS-gated thyristor.

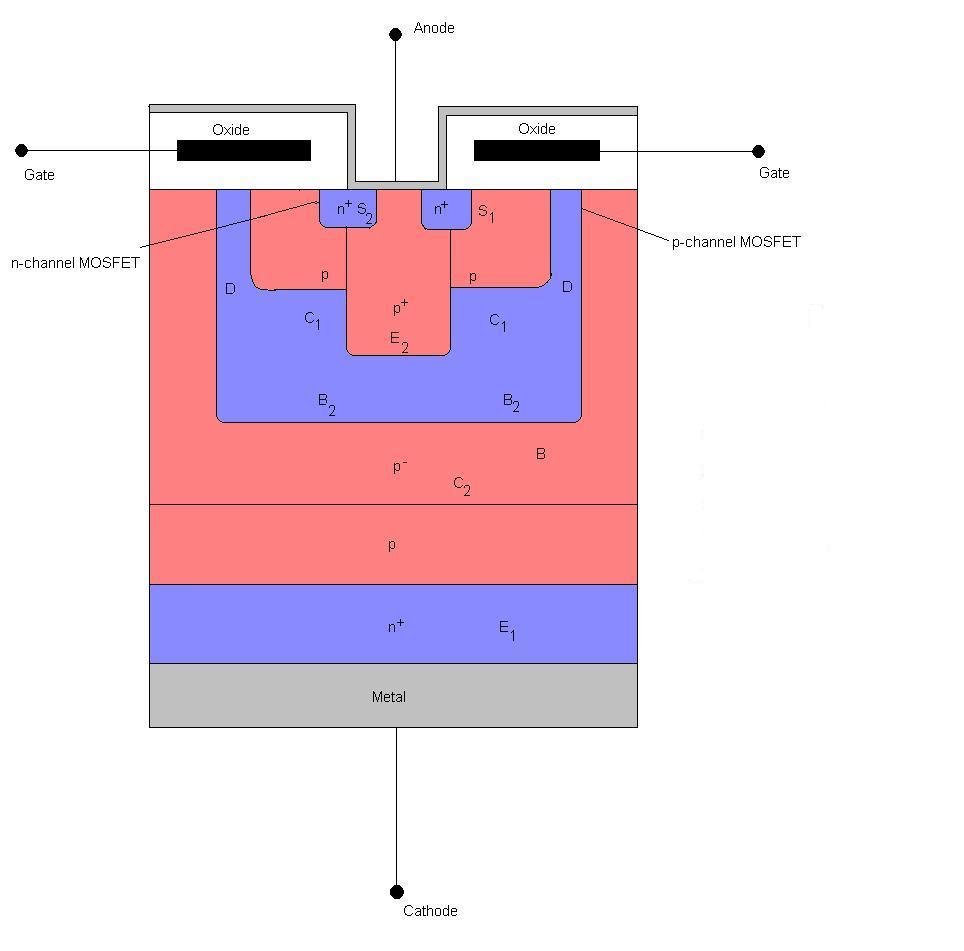
Schematic of a MOSFET-controlled thyristor

Positive voltage on the gate terminal with respect to the cathode turns the thyristor to the on state.

Negative voltage on the gate terminal with respect to the anode, which is close to cathode voltage during the on state, turns the thyristor to the off state.

MCTs were commercialized only briefly.
