= International Rectifier =

American technology company

International Rectifier Corporation an Infineon Technologies Company
- Type: Public
- Industry: Semiconductor; Integrated circuits
- Founded: 1947; 79 years ago
- Defunct: 2015
- Fate: Acquired by Infineon Technologies
- Headquarters: El Segundo, California
- Key people: Eric Lidow, Founder; Robert LeFort, President
- Revenue: US$1.1 billion (June 2014)
- Number of employees: 4,200 (13th January 2015)
- Parent: Infineon Technologies
- Website: Defunct

International Rectifier was an American power management technology company manufacturing analog and mixed-signal ICs, advanced circuit devices, integrated power systems, and high-performance integrated components for computing. On 13 January 2015, the company became a part of Infineon Technologies.

IR's products, as a part of Infineon Technologies' overall semiconductor portfolio, continue to be used in many applications including lighting, automobile, satellite, aircraft, and defense systems; as well as key components in power supply systems in electronics-based products that include especially microcomputers, servers, networking and telecommunications equipment.

== History ==
=== Founding and early history (1947–1960s) ===
International Rectifier (IR) was founded on August 9, 1947, in Los Angeles, California, by Leon Lidow and his son, Eric Lidow, both natives of Vilnius (in modern-day Lithuania). The younger Lidow had earned his degree in electrical engineering from the Technical University of Berlin in 1937 before emigrating to the United States. Prior to forming the company, Eric Lidow had co-founded the Selenium Corporation of America, which specialized in early photoelectric developments before its acquisition by the Sperry Corporation. Operating initially out of a small facility with only six employees, International Rectifier focused on putting to use specialized processes the Lidows developed for manufacturing selenium rectifiers—devices critical for converting alternating current (AC) into direct current (DC) in industrial and military electronics during the post-World War II boom.

To secure a steady footing in the capital-intensive electronics market, the company went public on the New York Stock Exchange in September 1958 under the ticker symbol IRF. By the 1960s, under Eric Lidow’s leadership, the company began implementing a broad diversification strategy to cushion its cyclical semiconductor earnings, an initiative that led to the founding of its biochemical and pharmaceutical subsidiary, Rachelle Laboratories.

=== Technological innovations (1950s–2012) ===
International Rectifier began pioneering advancements in semiconductor power management during the 1950s, commercializing the industry's first germanium rectifiers in November 1954 and introducing the first silicon-based rectifier in September 1959. The company expanded its development into discrete components in 1974, producing the first power and Darlington transistors to utilize glass passivation. In 1979, the company introduced the first hexagonal power MOSFET (marketed as HEXFET), followed by the creation of intelligent power integrated circuits (ICs) in 1983.

The company transitioned into advanced wafer-level architectures in 2000 with the development of FlipFET wafer packaging. In 2002, it introduced DirectFET, a proprietary MOSFET packaging technology engineered to mitigate thermal density limitations common in consumer electronics, advanced computing, and communication infrastructure. This technological platform expanded into specialized applications over the following decade, including the iMOTION integrated design platform for motor control systems in 2003, SmartRectifier ICs for AC/DC power conversion in 2006, and SupIRBuck integrated voltage regulators in 2007. The firm introduced a gallium nitride (GaN)-based power device platform in 2008, which was followed by the launch of PowIRstage devices, CHiL digital controllers, micro-integrated motor control modules, and automotive-grade COOLiRIGBTs between 2011 and 2012.

=== Pfizer patent litigation ===
In August 1983, International Rectifier suffered a catastrophic legal defeat following a protracted patent infringement lawsuit brought by pharmaceutical giant Pfizer, Inc. over the broad-spectrum antibiotic doxycycline. The legal conflict traced back to the late 1960s, when IR sought to diversify its business away from the highly volatile, cyclical cash flows of the early semiconductor market. Believing that its core corporate expertise in fine chemical processing and crystallography could translate into pharmaceuticals, IR established a subsidiary named Rachelle Laboratories in Long Beach, California.

Rachelle Laboratories initially specialized in licensing chemical and fermentation technologies to manufacture generic semi-synthetic antibiotics, such as tetracycline. Through an Italian subsidiary, Rachelle Laboratories Italia S.p.A., IR began manufacturing generic doxycycline—marketed by Pfizer under the brand name Vibramycin—using a process identical to Pfizer’s patented method. IR imported the drug into the United States and began distributing it in 1973 at a price substantially lower than Pfizer's, capturing a massive chunk of the generic market. Additionally, because doxycycline was widely effective in livestock management, IR integrated this chemical wing into bulk animal health products and agricultural feed additives.

Pfizer immediately filed an infringement suit in the Central District of California. Though IR initially won a partial summary judgment in 1975 when the district court declared Pfizer’s patent invalid due to alleged misconduct, the decision was overturned on appeal. In August 1983, the court finalized a staggering $55.8 million judgment against IR for willful infringement.

Faced with imminent bankruptcy from the multi-million dollar penalty, International Rectifier reached a settlement agreement with Pfizer. To satisfy the judgment, IR divested and completely surrendered its animal health, feed additive, and biochemical assets directly to Pfizer, effectively dissolving Rachelle Laboratories. This forced exit from the pharmaceutical sector compelled IR to abandon its diversification strategy and re-focus exclusively on its core specialties: power semiconductors and advanced power management technologies. This strategic pivot directly preceded the mass commercialization of IR's proprietary HEXFET power MOSFETs, which ultimately saved the company and established its dominance in energy-efficient power conversion systems.

=== Acquisition by Infineon (2014–2015) ===
In August 2014, German semiconductor manufacturer Infineon Technologies announced an agreement to acquire International Rectifier for approximately $3 billion in cash. The transaction officially closed on January 13, 2015, at which point International Rectifier ceased independent operations and was integrated as a wholly owned subsidiary of Infineon Technologies.

== Historical manufacturing infrastructure ==
Following its 2015 acquisition by Infineon Technologies, International Rectifier's vertically integrated manufacturing footprint—consisting of front-end silicon wafer fabrication plants (fabs) and back-end packaging hubs—was reorganized. Rather than decommissioning the infrastructure, Infineon integrated several core facilities directly into its global supply chain, divested others to competing semiconductor manufacturers, or initiated phased consolidations to optimize long-term production density.

The primary historical facilities and their operational trajectories include:

- Temecula, California: Originally established as the "HEXFET America" plant, this high-volume automated wafer fabrication facility served as the company's manufacturing flagship for power MOSFETs. Following the acquisition, Infineon maintained the facility as a fully active, core asset within its global front-end manufacturing network, specialized in power management technologies.
- Leominster, Massachusetts: This plant specializes in high-reliability (HiRel) packaging, thermal screening, and radiation-hardened (rad-hard) discrete power modules certified for military, aerospace, and space applications under MIL-PRF-38534 guidelines. Due to stringent defense re-certification requirements, the site continues active operations under the subsidiary name IR HiRel Products, LLC (An Infineon Technologies Company).
- El Segundo, California: The long-term corporate headquarters and manufacturing cradle of the company was phased out of high-volume hardware fabrication, but was retained by Infineon to serve as a major North American administrative, sales, engineering, and research and development hub.
- Newport, Wales: This large silicon fab—originally the architecturally notable Inmos microprocessor factory designed by Richard Rogers—was acquired by IR out of receivership in 2002. Infineon operated the plant until 2017 before selling it to Nexperia as part of a footprint optimization strategy; ownership subsequently transferred to Vishay Intertechnology, keeping the plant active under a different corporate flag.
- Tijuana, Mexico: Established by International Rectifier in 1973, this high-volume back-end facility managed discrete power semiconductor packaging, assembly, and testing lines for over forty years. Following the buyout, Infineon sustained operations before initiating a phased manufacturing exit to consolidate its high-volume packaging portfolio into its centralized Asian mega-hubs.
- Borgaro Torinese, Italy: A critical manufacturing center for European power electronics and planar Schottky rectifiers since 1969. To raise working capital during its mid-2000s structural reorganization, International Rectifier sold this entire facility to Vishay Semiconductor Italiana in 2007, where it remains an operational plant.
