= Distribution of lightning =

Lightning flash density – 12 hourly averages over the year (NASA OTD/LIS) This shows that lightning is much more frequent in summer than in winter, and from noon to midnight compared to midnight to noon.

The distribution of lightning, or the incidence of individual strikes, in any particular place is highly dependent on its location, climate, and time of year. Lightning does have an underlying spatial distribution. High quality lightning data has only recently become available, but the data indicates that lightning occurs on average 44±5 times every second over the entire Earth, making a total of about 1.4 billion flashes per year.

== Ratios of lightning types ==
The lightning flash rate averaged over the Earth for intra-cloud (IC) + cloud-to-cloud (CC) to cloud-to-ground (CG) is in the ratio: (IC+CC):CG = 3:1. The base of the negative region in a cloud is normally at roughly the elevation where freezing occurs. The closer this region is to the ground, the more likely cloud-to-ground strikes are. In the tropics, where the freeze zone is higher, the (IC+CC):CG ratio is about 9:1. In Norway, at latitude 60° N, where the freezing elevation is lower, the (IC+CC):CG ratio is about 1:1.

== Distribution ==
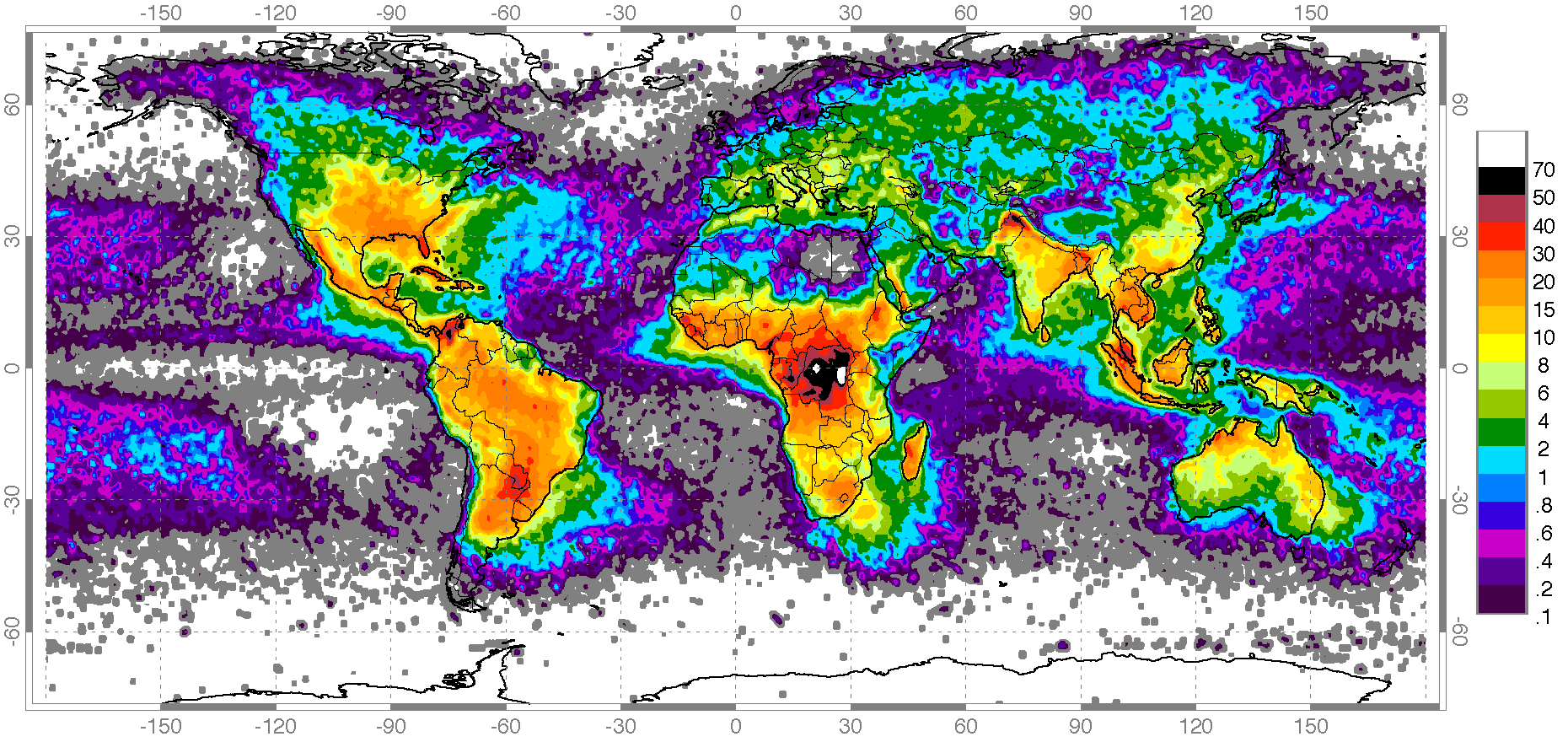
Global map of lightning frequency--strikes/km^{2}/yr. The high lightning areas are on land located in the tropics. Areas with almost no lightning are the Arctic and Antarctic, closely followed by the oceans which have only 0.1 to 1 strikes/km^{2}/yr.

The map on the right shows that lightning is not distributed evenly around the planet. About 70% of lightning occurs on land in the Tropics, where the majority of thunderstorms occur. The North and South Poles and the areas over the oceans have the fewest lightning strikes. The place where lightning occurs most often is above the Catatumbo river, which feeds Lake Maracaibo in Venezuela, where the so-called Catatumbo lightning flashes several times per minute, with lightning happening up to 300 nights a year. This gives Lake Maracaibo the highest number of lightning strikes per square kilometer in the world, at 250. The region with the second-most is the village Kifuka, in the mountains of the Democratic Republic of the Congo, where the elevation is around 1,700 metres (5,600 ft), receives 232 lightning strikes per square kilometer (600 per sq mi) a year.

Malaysia and Singapore have one of the highest rates of lightning activity in the world, after Indonesia and Colombia. The city of Teresina in northern Brazil has the third-highest rate of occurrences of lightning strikes in the world. The surrounding region is referred to as the Chapada do Corisco ("Flash Lightning Flatlands").

In the United States, the west coast has the fewest lightning strikes, while states such as Texas, Florida, and Oklahoma have the largest number of recorded lightning flashes as of 2025. In 2018, 14 Florida counties ranked in the top 15 counties in the United States for having the highest lightning density. Florida previously had the largest average number of recorded lightning strikes in the United States. Much of Florida is a peninsula, bordered by the ocean on three sides with a subtropical climate. The result is the nearly daily development of clouds that produce thunderstorms. For example, "Lightning Alley"—an area from Tampa to Orlando—experiences an extremely high density of lightning strikes. In 2007, there were as many as 50 strikes per square mile (about 20 per km^{2}) per year. In their 2018 Annual Lightning Report, Vaisala reported there were 24 strikes per square mile (about 9 per km^{2}) per year in Florida and as of 2025, AEM Weather (Advanced Environmental Monitoring) reports that Oklahoma experienced as many as 73 flashes per square mile (about 28 per km^{2}), the current highest in the country. Also notably, the Empire State Building in New York City is struck by lightning on average 23 times each year, and was once struck 8 times in 24 minutes.

== Lightning data sources ==
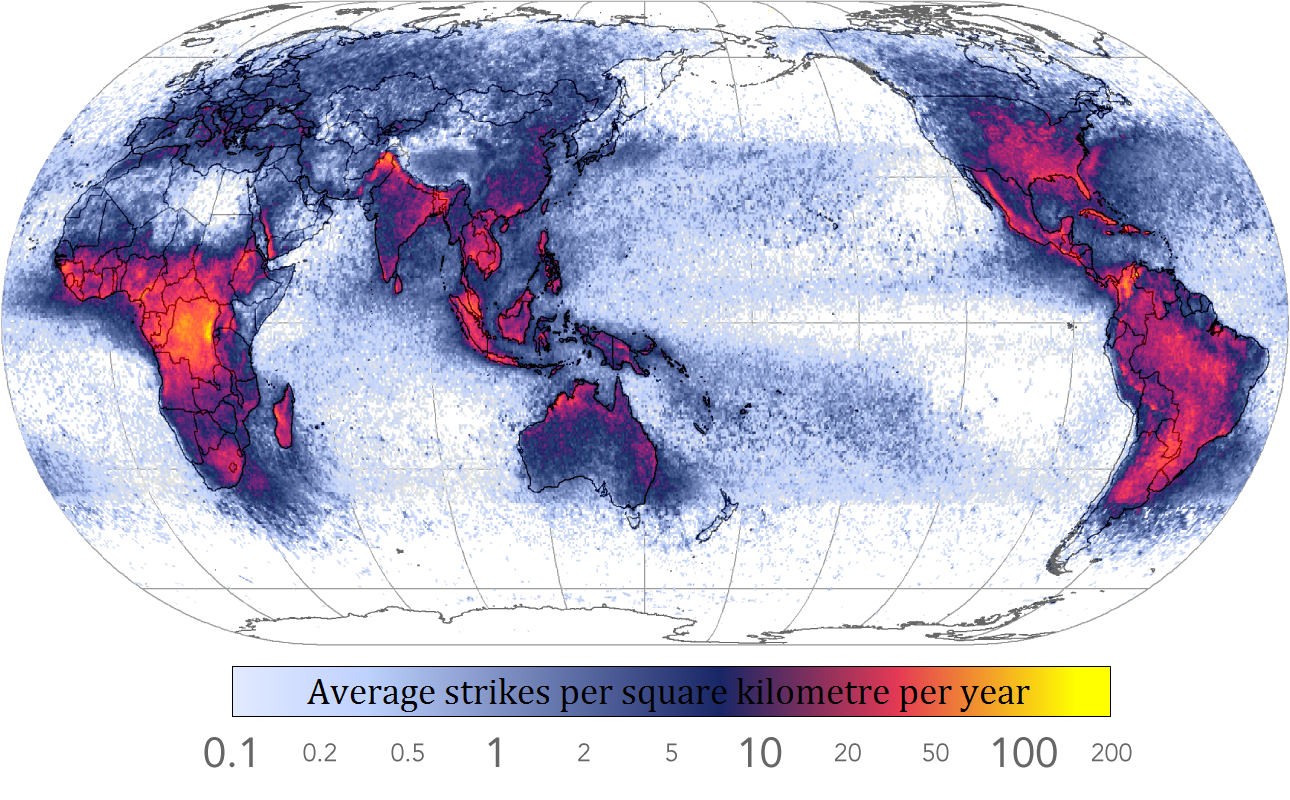
World map showing frequency of lightning strikes, in flashes per square kilometer (km²) per year (equal-area projection). Lightning strikes most frequently in the Democratic Republic of the Congo and the Northwest of Venezuela. Combined 1995–2003 data from the Optical Transient Detector and 1998–2003 data from the Lightning Imaging Sensor.

Before technology was developed to accurately detect and record lightning flashes, climatologies were based upon the number of audible detection of thunder. The keraunic (or ceraunic) level was the average number of days per year when thunder was heard in a given area. A map of isokeraunic contours was used to give a rough estimate of relative lightning frequencies. However, variations in population, the distance sound travels due to terrain made such maps quite spurious, and human hearing made such maps imprecise. It also could not hope to differentiate between different types of lightning.

Electronic lightning sensors advanced during the 20th century using radio wave disruptions. Originally the expense of such instruments caused only sporadic development. However a small set of sensors in the U.S. employed during a 1979 project by NOAA’s National Severe Storms Laboratory grew into the National Lightning Detection Network (NLDN), achieving nationwide coverage in 1989. Vaisala is now the operator and primary distributor of data from the NLDN, and developed the Canadian Lightning Detection Network (CLDN) as of 1998. The EUCLID network is the European shared network, covering most of the continent apart from some far eastern nations. Collaborative amateur development spurred the formation of the Blitzortung community, which offers real-time lightning strike data from most of the world (as well as historical data dating back to 2008) under the Creative Commons license. In the United States, lightning monitoring is also frequently augmented by highly localized, but typically more dense detection networks such as the Oklahoma Lightning Mapping Array or the North Alabama Lightning Mapping Array, also known as NALMA.

Satellite lightning measurements began in 1997 when NASA and National Space Development Agency (NASDA) of Japan launched the Lightning Imaging Sensor (LIS) aboard the TRMM satellite, providing periodic scan swaths over tropical and sub-tropical portions of the globe until the satellite's was lost in 2015. In 2017, NOAA started deployment of Geostationary Lightning Mappers aboard their GOES-R class satellites, offering continual coverage of much of the land within the western Hemisphere.

Maps of the U.S. lightning strike/km^{2}yr averaged from 1997-2010 are available from Vaisala's webpage for a fee. More detailed U.S. regional lightning maps based on the National Oceanic and Atmospheric Administration (NOAA) and the National Weather Service (NWS) data centered on different cities are put out by the Cooperative Institute for Applied Meteorological Studies at Texas A&M University.

== See also ==
- Lightning records
- Blitzortung — A worldwide, real time, community collaborative lightning location network.
