= Heat lightning =

Distant flashes of cloud-to-ground lightning from a cumulonimbus

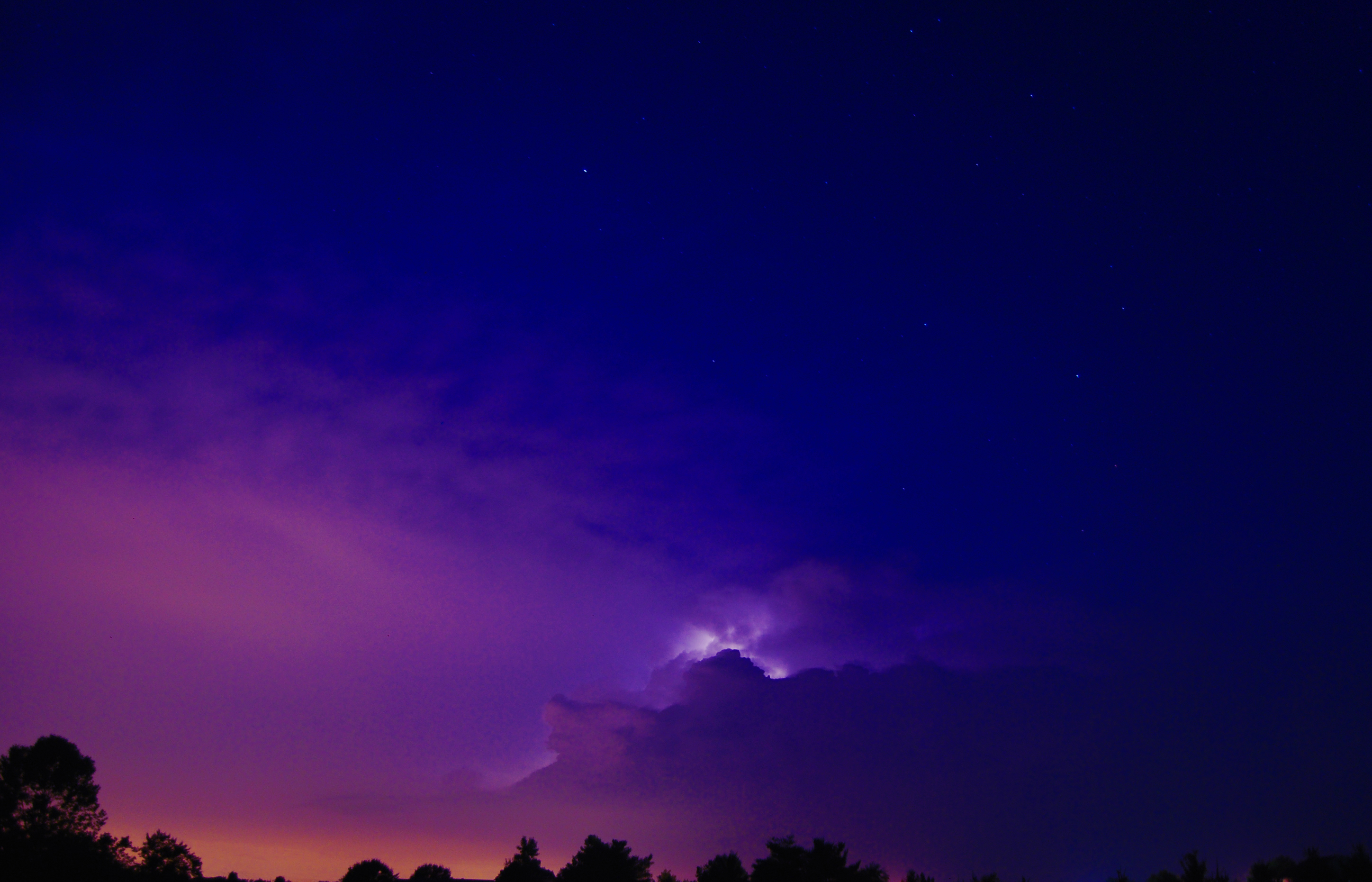
Distant lightning near Louisville, Kentucky

Heat lightning is a misnomer used for the faint flashes of lightning on the horizon or other clouds from distant thunderstorms that do not appear to have accompanying sounds of thunder.

Heat lightning in Tokyo

The actual phenomenon that is sometimes called heat lightning is simply cloud-to-ground lightning that occurs very far away, with thunder that dissipates before it reaches the observer. At night, it is possible to see the flashes of lightning from very far distances, up to 100 miles (160 km), but the sound does not carry that far. In the United States, lightning is especially common in Florida, which is considered the deadliest state for lightning strikes in the country. This is due to high moisture content in the lower atmosphere and high surface temperature, which produces strong sea breezes along the Florida coast. As a result, heat lightning is often seen over the water at night, the remnants of storms that formed during the day along a sea breeze front coming in from the opposite coast.

Heat lightning is not to be confused with electrically induced luminosity actually generated at mesospheric altitudes above thunderstorm systems (and likewise visible at exceedingly great ranges), a phenomenon known as "sprites".

== Cloud-to-ground lightning ==
The movement of sound in the atmosphere depends on the properties of the air, such as temperature and density. Because temperature and density change with height, the sound of thunder is refracted through the troposphere. This refraction results in spaces through which the thunder does not propagate. The sound of thunder often reflects off the Earth's surface. The rumbling sound is partly due to these reflections. This reflection and refraction can leave voids where thunder cannot be heard.

Earth's curvature also contributes to distant observers not hearing the thunderclap. Thunder is more likely to reflect off the Earth's surface before it reaches an observer far from the strike, and only the right refraction and reflection of the sound off of the atmosphere will give it the range it needs to be heard far away. The reflection and refraction in the troposphere determines who hears the strike and who doesn't. Usually, the troposphere will reflect the light, and leave out the sound - in these cases some fraction of the light emanating from distant thunderstorms (whose distant clouds may be so low to the horizon as to be essentially invisible) is scattered by the upper atmosphere and thus visible to remote observers.

Under optimum conditions, the most intense thunderstorms can be seen at up to 100 miles (160 km) over flat terrain or water when the clouds are illuminated by large lightning discharges. However, an upper limit of 30–50 miles (48–80 km) is more common due to topography, trees on the horizon, low to mid-level clouds, and the fact that local visibilities are generally no more than 25 miles (40 km). The height of the anvil (the large, plume-like top of a thunderhead) also contributes—45,000 feet (14,000 m) is very common in the mid latitudes for warm-season thunderstorms, but the anvil height can range from 35,000 feet (11,000 m) to a current record of 78,000 ft (24,000 m).

== See also ==
- Dry lightning
- List of lightning phenomena
- Upper-atmospheric lightning
- Sprite lightning
- Distribution of lightning
- Ball lightning
