= Lightning =

Weather phenomenon involving electrostatic discharge

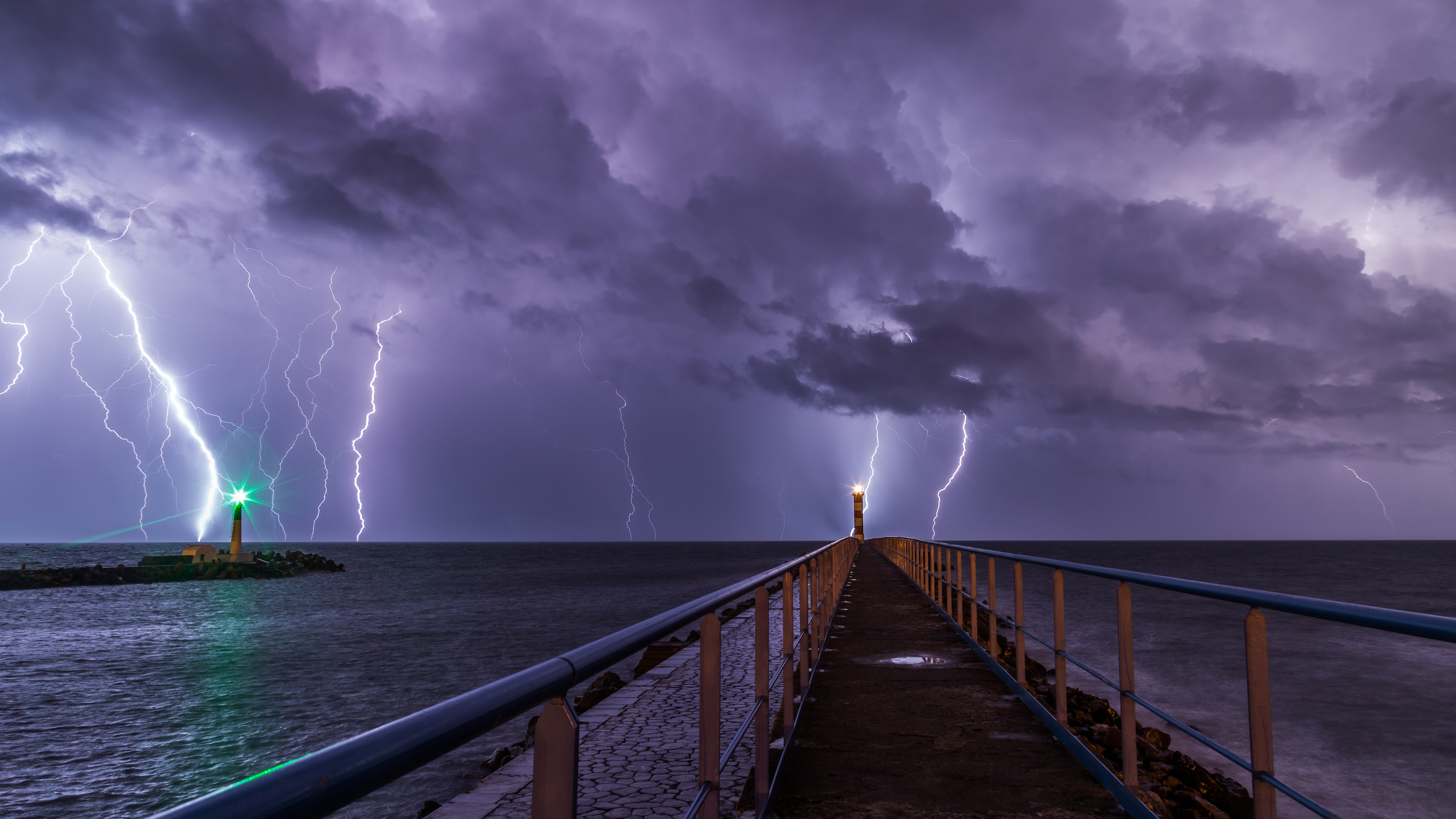
Strokes of cloud-to-ground lightning strike the Mediterranean Sea off of Port-la-Nouvelle in southern France.

Lightning is a natural phenomenon consisting of electrostatic discharges occurring through the atmosphere between two electrically charged regions. One or both regions are within the atmosphere, with the second region sometimes occurring on the ground. Following the lightning, the regions become partially or wholly electrically neutralized.

Lightning involves a near-instantaneous release of energy on a scale averaging between 200 megajoules and 7 gigajoules. The air around the lightning flash rapidly heats to temperatures of about 30,000 °C (54,000 °F). There is an emission of electromagnetic radiation across a wide range of wavelengths, some visible as a bright flash. Lightning also causes thunder, a sound from the shock wave which develops as heated gases in the vicinity of the discharge experience a sudden increase in pressure.

The most common occurrence of a lightning event is known as a thunderstorm, though they can also commonly occur in other types of energetic weather systems, such as volcanic eruptions. Lightning influences the global atmospheric electrical circuit and atmospheric chemistry and is a natural ignition source of wildfires. Lightning is considered an Essential Climate Variable by the World Meteorological Organization, and its scientific study is called fulminology.

== Forms ==
Three primary forms of lightning are distinguished by where they occur:

- Intra-cloud (IC) or in-cloud – Within a single thundercloud
- Cloud-to-cloud (CC) or inter-cloud – Between two clouds
- Cloud-to-ground (CG) – Between a cloud and the ground, in which case it is referred to as a lightning strike.

Many other observational variants are recognized, including: volcanic lightning, which can occur during volcanic eruptions; "heat lightning", which can be seen from a great distance but not heard; dry lightning, which can cause forest fires; and ball lightning, which is rarely observed scientifically.

The most direct effects of lightning on humans occur as a result of cloud-to-ground lightning, even though intra-cloud and cloud-to-cloud are more common. Intra-cloud and cloud-to-cloud lightning indirectly affect humans through their influence on atmospheric chemistry.

There are variations of each type, such as "positive" versus "negative" CG flashes, that have different physical characteristics common to each which can be measured.

=== Cloud to ground (CG) ===
Cloud to ground seen in slow motion

Cloud-to-ground (CG) lightning is a lightning discharge between a thundercloud and the ground. It is initiated by a stepped leader moving down from the cloud, which is met by a streamer moving up from the ground.

CG is the least common, but best understood of all types of lightning. It is easier to study scientifically because it terminates on a physical object, namely the ground, and lends itself to being measured by instruments on the ground. Of the three primary types of lightning, it poses the greatest threat to life and property, since it terminates on the ground or "strikes".

The overall discharge, termed a flash, is composed of a number of processes such as preliminary breakdown, stepped leaders, connecting leaders, return strokes, dart leaders, and subsequent return strokes. The conductivity of the electrical ground, be it soil, fresh water, or salt water, may affect the lightning discharge rate and thus visible characteristics.

==== Positive and negative lightning ====
Cloud-to-ground (CG) lightning is either positive or negative, as defined by the direction of the conventional electric current between cloud and ground. Most CG lightning is negative, meaning that a negative charge is transferred (electrons flow) downwards to ground along the lightning channel (the conventional current flows from the ground up to the cloud). The reverse happens in a positive CG flash, where electrons travel upward along the lightning channel, while also a positive charge is transferred downward to the ground (the conventional current travels from cloud to ground).

Positive lightning is less common than negative lightning and on average makes up less than 5% of all lightning strikes.

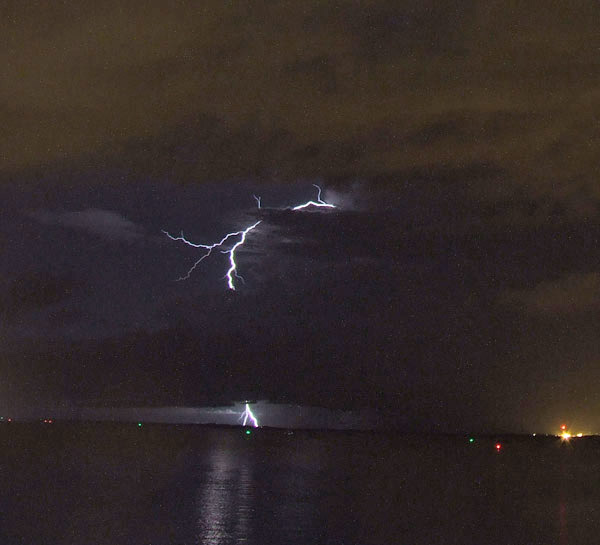
A bolt from the blue lightning strike which appears to initiate from a clear patch of sky, but the turbulent sky above the anvil cloud drives a bolt of plasma through the cloud directly to the ground. They are commonly referred to as positive flashes, despite the fact that they are usually negative in polarity.

There are a number of mechanisms theorized to result in the formation of positive lightning. These are mainly based on movement or intensification of charge centres in the cloud. Such changes in cloud charging may come about as a result of variations in vertical wind shear or precipitation, or dissipation of the storm. Positive flashes may also result from certain behaviour of in-cloud discharges, e.g. breaking off or branching from existing flashes.

Positive lightning strikes tend to be much more intense than their negative counterparts. An average bolt of negative lightning creates an electric current of 30,000 amperes (30 kA), transferring a total 15 C (coulombs) of electric charge and 1 gigajoule of energy. Large bolts of positive lightning can create up to 120 kA and transfer 350 C. The average positive ground flash has roughly double the peak current of a typical negative flash, and can produce peak currents up to 400 kA and charges of several hundred coulombs. Furthermore, positive ground flashes with high peak currents are commonly followed by long continuing currents, a correlation not seen in negative ground flashes.

As a result of their greater power, positive lightning strikes are considerably more dangerous than negative strikes. Positive lightning produces both higher peak currents and longer continuing currents, making them capable of heating surfaces to much higher levels which increases the likelihood of a fire being ignited. The long distances positive lightning can propagate through clear air explains why they are known as "bolts from the blue", giving no warning to observers.

Positive lightning has also been shown to trigger the occurrence of upward lightning flashes from the tops of tall structures and is largely responsible for the initiation of sprites several tens of kilometers above ground level. Positive lightning tends to occur more frequently in winter storms, as with thundersnow, during intense tornadoes and in the dissipation stage of a thunderstorm. Huge quantities of extremely low frequency (ELF) and very low frequency (VLF) radio waves are also generated.

Contrary to popular belief, positive lightning flashes do not necessarily originate from the anvil or the upper positive charge region and strike a rain-free area outside of the thunderstorm. This belief is based on the outdated idea that lightning leaders are unipolar and originate from their respective charge region. Despite the popular misconception that flashes originating from the anvil are positive, because they seem to originate from the positive charge region, observations have shown that these are in fact negative flashes. They begin as IC flashes within the cloud, the negative leader then exits the cloud from the positive charge region before propagating through clear air and striking the ground some distance away.

=== Cloud to cloud (CC) and intra-cloud (IC) ===
Lightning discharges may occur between areas of cloud without contacting the ground. When it occurs between two separate clouds, it is known as cloud-to-cloud (CC) or inter-cloud lightning; when it occurs between areas of differing electric potential within a single cloud, it is known as intra-cloud (IC) lightning. IC lightning is the most frequently occurring type.

IC lightning most commonly occurs between the upper anvil portion and lower reaches of a given thunderstorm. This lightning can sometimes be observed at great distances at night as so-called "sheet lightning". In such instances, the observer may see only a flash of light without hearing any thunder.

Another term used for cloud–cloud or cloud–cloud–ground lightning is "Anvil Crawler", due to the habit of charge, typically originating beneath or within the anvil and scrambling through the upper cloud layers of a thunderstorm, often generating dramatic multiple branch strokes. These are usually seen as a thunderstorm passes over the observer or begins to decay. The most vivid crawler behavior occurs in well developed thunderstorms that feature extensive rear anvil shearing.

Branching of cloud to cloud lightning, New Delhi, India.

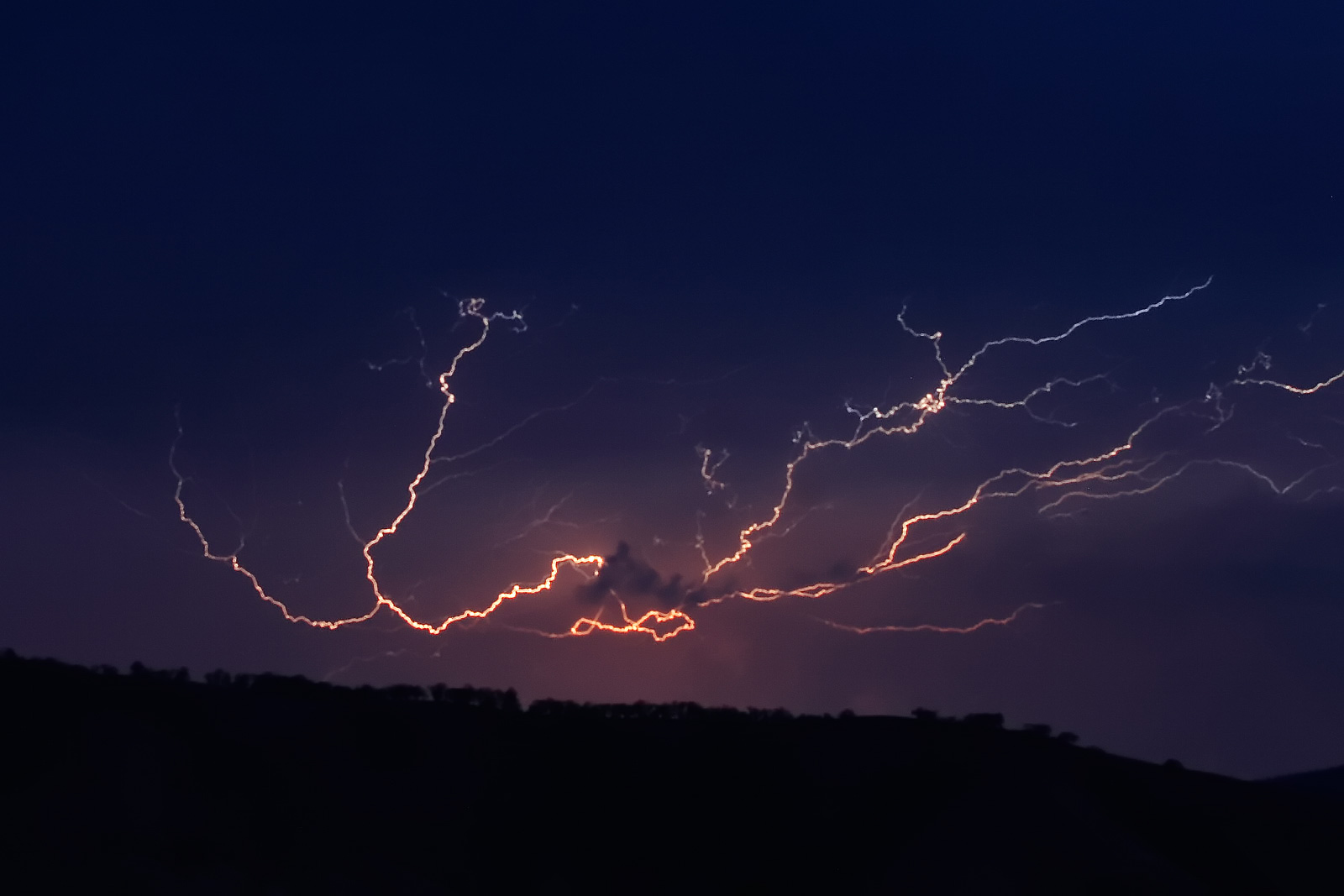
Multiple paths of cloud-to-cloud lightning, Swifts Creek, Australia.

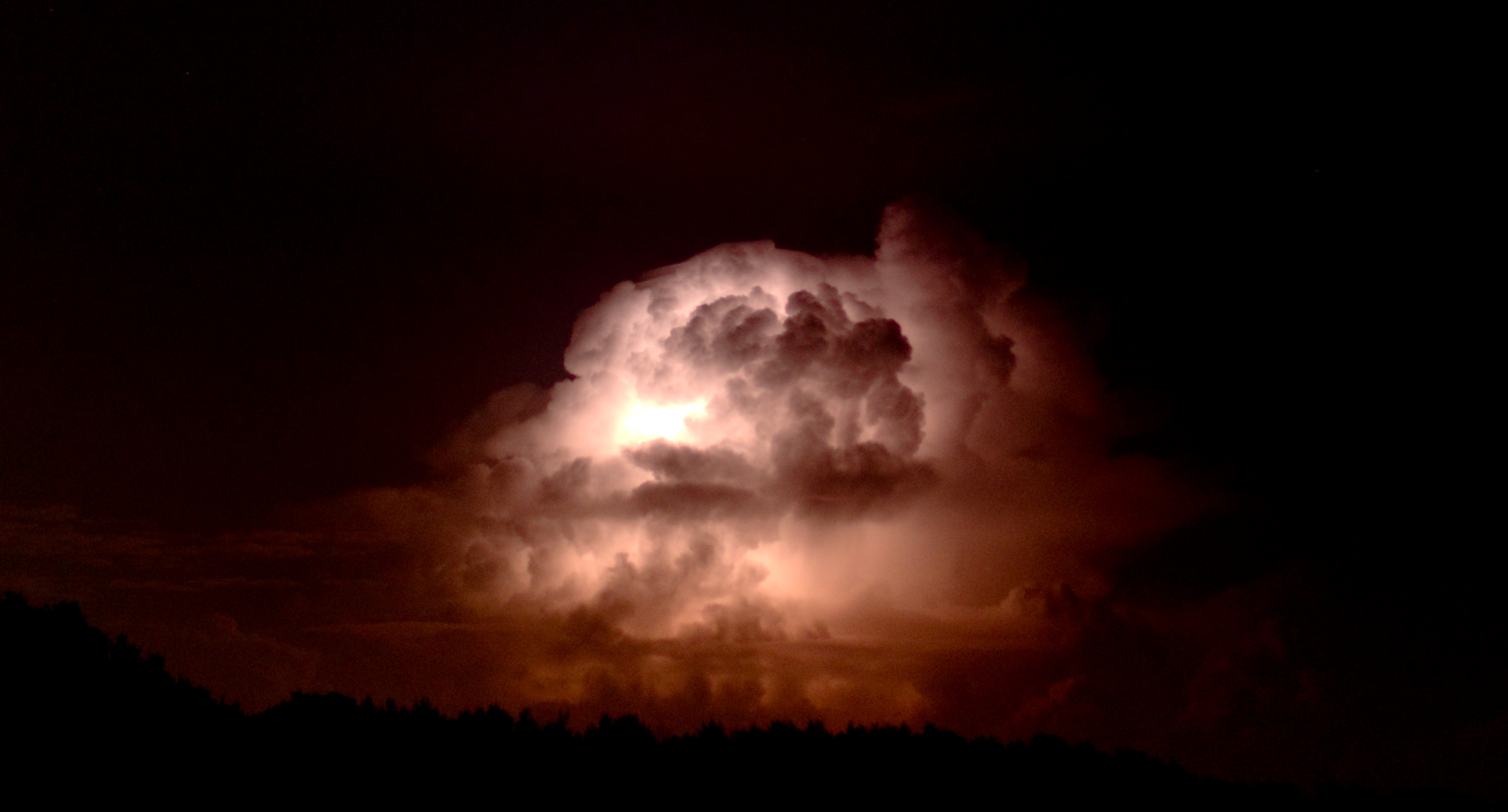
Intra-clouds lightning over the Baltic Sea.

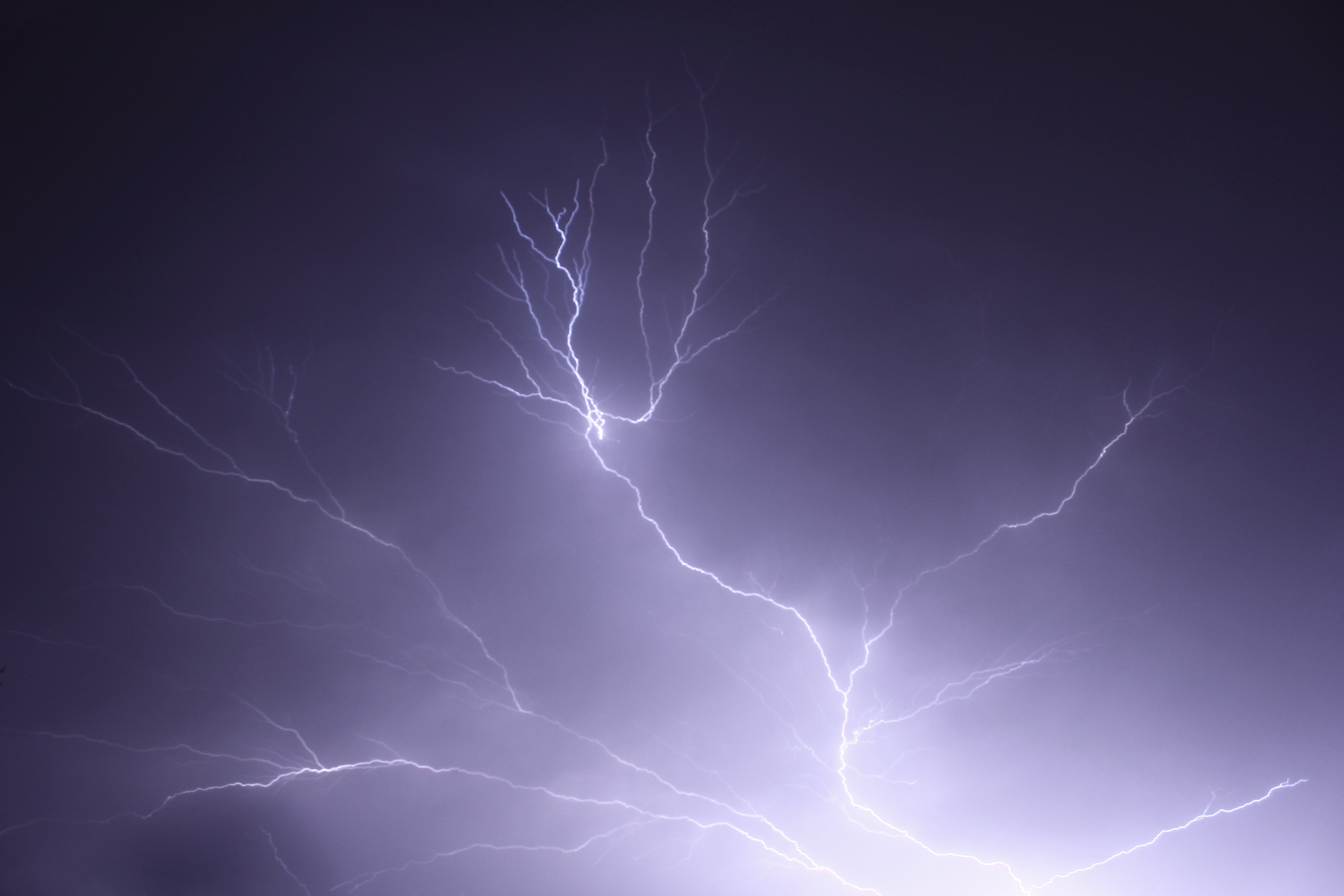
Cloud-to-cloud lightning, Albury, Australia

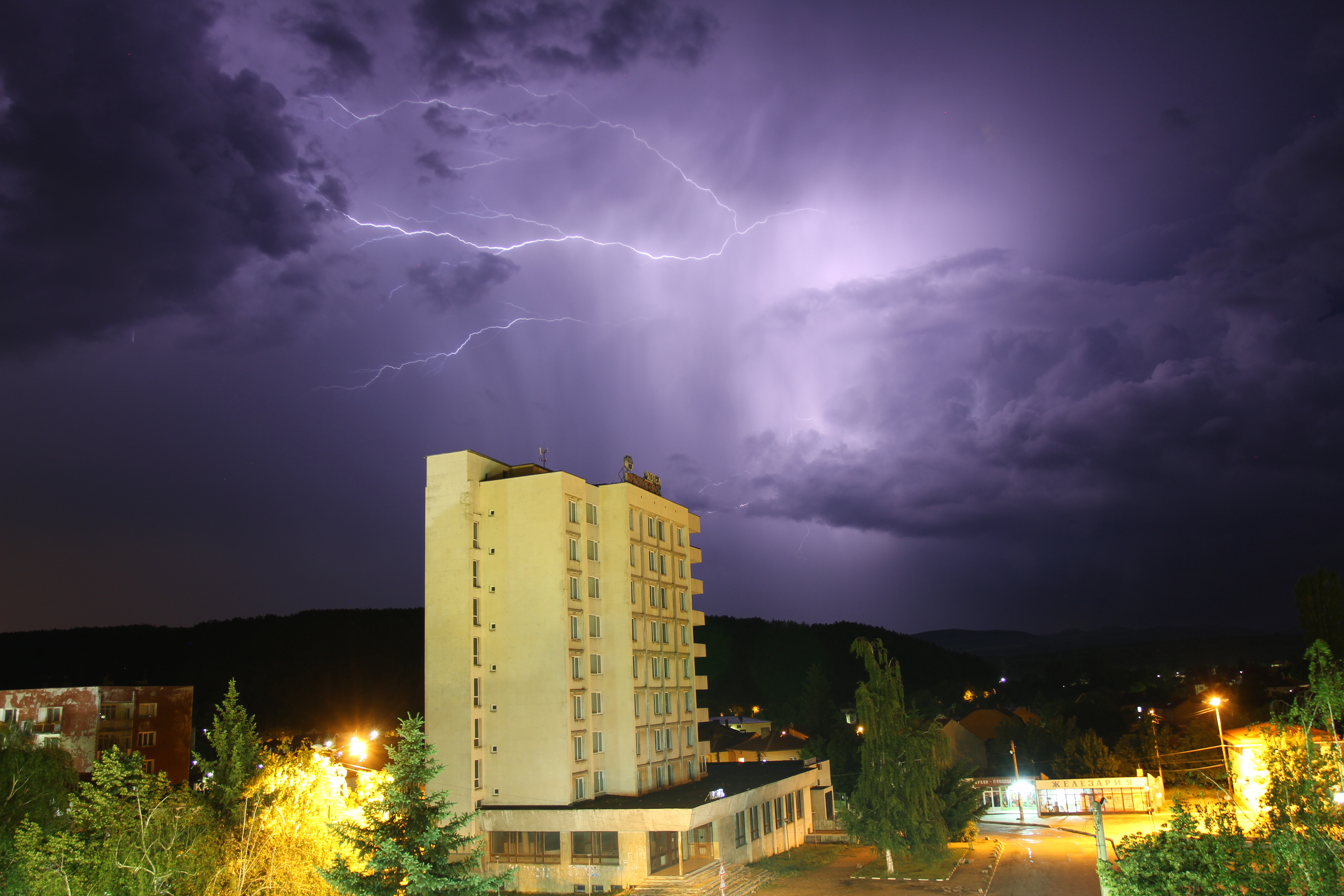
Lightning over Slivnitsa, Bulgaria.

== Formation ==
The processes involved in lightning formation fall into the following categories:

1. Large-scale atmospheric phenomena in which charge separation can occur (e.g. storm)
2. Microscopic and macroscopic processes that result in charge separation
3. Establishment of an electric field
4. Discharge through a lightning channel

=== Atmospheric phenomena in which lightning occurs ===
Lightning primarily occurs when warm air is mixed with colder air masses, resulting in atmospheric disturbances necessary for polarizing the atmosphere. The disturbances result in storms, and when those storms also result in lightning and thunder, they are called a thunderstorm.

Lightning can also occur during dust storms, forest fires, tornadoes, volcanic eruptions, and even in the cold of winter, where the lightning is known as thundersnow. Hurricanes typically generate some lightning, mainly in the rainbands as much as 160 km (99 mi) from the center.

Intense forest fires, such as those seen in the 2019–20 Australian bushfire season, can create their own weather systems that can produce lightning (also called fire lightning) and other weather phenomena. Intense heat from a fire causes air to rapidly rise within the smoke plume, causing the formation of pyrocumulonimbus clouds. Cooler air is drawn in by this turbulent, rising air, helping to cool the plume. The rising plume is further cooled by the lower atmospheric pressure at high altitude, allowing the moisture in it to condense into cloud. Pyrocumulonimbus clouds form in an unstable atmosphere. These weather systems can produce dry lightning, fire tornadoes, intense winds, and dirty hail.

As well as the thermodynamic and dynamic conditions of the atmosphere, aerosol (e.g. dust or smoke) composition is thought to influence the frequency of lightning flashes in a storm. A specific example of this is that relatively high lightning frequency is seen along ship tracks.

Airplane contrails have also been observed to influence lightning to a small degree. The water vapor-dense contrails of airplanes may provide a lower resistance pathway through the atmosphere having some influence upon the establishment of an ionic pathway for a lightning flash to follow. Rocket exhaust plumes provided a pathway for lightning when it was witnessed striking the Apollo 12 rocket shortly after takeoff.

Thermonuclear explosions, by providing extra material for electrical conduction and a very turbulent localized atmosphere, have been seen triggering lightning flashes within the mushroom cloud. In addition, intense gamma radiation from large nuclear explosions may develop intensely charged regions in the surrounding air through Compton scattering. The intensely charged space charge regions create multiple clear-air lightning discharges shortly after the device detonates.

Some high energy cosmic rays produced by supernovas as well as solar particles from the solar wind, enter the atmosphere and electrify the air, which may create pathways for lightning channels.

=== Charge separation ===
==== Charge separation in thunderstorms ====
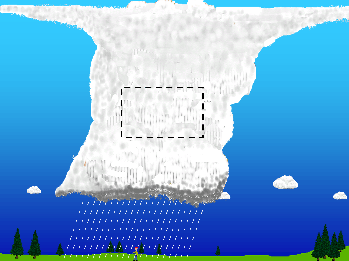
(Figure 1) The main charging area in a thunderstorm occurs in the central part of the storm where the air is moving upward rapidly (updraft) and temperatures range from −15 to −25 °C (5 to −13 °F).

(Figure 2) When the rising ice crystals collide with graupel, the ice crystals become positively charged and the graupel becomes negatively charged.

The upper part of the thunderstorm cloud becomes positively charged while the middle to the lower part of the thunderstorm cloud becomes negatively charged.

The details of the charging process are still being studied by scientists, but there is general agreement on some of the basic concepts of thunderstorm charge separation, also known as electrification. Electrification can be by the triboelectric effect leading to electron or ion transfer between colliding bodies.

The main charging area in a thunderstorm occurs in the central part of the storm where air is moving upward rapidly (updraft) and temperatures range from −15 to −25 °C (5 to −13 °F); see Figure 1. In that area, the combination of temperature and rapid upward air movement produces a mixture of super-cooled cloud droplets (small water droplets below freezing), small ice crystals, and graupel (soft hail). The updraft carries the super-cooled cloud droplets and very small ice crystals upward. At the same time, the graupel, which is considerably larger and denser, tends to fall or be suspended in the rising air.

The differences in the movement of the cloud particles cause collisions to occur. When the rising ice crystals collide with graupel, the ice crystals become positively charged and the graupel becomes negatively charged; see Figure 2. The updraft carries the positively charged ice crystals upward toward the top of the storm cloud. The larger and denser graupel is either suspended in the middle of the thunderstorm cloud or falls toward the lower part of the storm. Typically, the upper part of the thunderstorm cloud becomes positively charged while the middle to lower part of the thunderstorm cloud becomes negatively charged. The above process of charge separation as a result of cloud particle collisions is normally referred to as the non-inductive charging mechanism.

The upward motions within the storm and winds at higher levels in the atmosphere tend to cause the small ice crystals (and positive charge) in the upper part of the thunderstorm cloud to spread out horizontally some distance from the thunderstorm cloud base. This part of the thunderstorm cloud is called the anvil. While this is the main charging process for the thunderstorm cloud, some of these charges can be redistributed by air movements within the storm (updrafts and downdrafts). In addition, there is a small but important positive charge buildup near the bottom of the thunderstorm cloud due to the precipitation and warmer temperatures. The positive-negative-positive charge regions commonly occur in mature thunderstorms, and referred to as the tripolar charge structure.

There are also other charging processes that may play a role in thunderstorms, but are generally thought to be less important. An inductive charging mechanism has been studied, and would arise from the polarization of cloud droplets in the presence of the fair-weather electric field. It has also been stated that uncharged, colliding water-drops can become charged because of charge transfer between them (as aqueous ions) in an electric field as would exist in a thunderstorm.

The induced separation of charge in pure liquid water has been known since the 1840s as has the electrification of pure liquid water by the triboelectric effect. William Thomson (Lord Kelvin) demonstrated that charge separation in water occurs in the usual electric fields at the Earth's surface and developed a continuous electric field measuring device using that knowledge. The physical separation of charge into different regions using liquid water was demonstrated by Kelvin with the Kelvin water dropper. The most likely charge-carrying species were considered to be the aqueous hydrogen ion and the aqueous hydroxide ion. An electron is not stable in liquid water concerning a hydroxide ion plus dissolved hydrogen for the time scales involved in thunderstorms. The electrical charging of solid water ice has also been considered. The charged species were again considered to be the hydrogen ion and the hydroxide ion.

=== Establishing an electric field ===
In order for an electrostatic discharge to occur, two preconditions are necessary: first, a sufficiently high potential difference between two regions of space must exist, and second, a high-resistance medium must obstruct the free, unimpeded equalization of the opposite charges. The atmosphere provides the electrical insulation, or barrier, that prevents free equalization between charged regions of opposite polarity. Meanwhile, a thunderstorm can provide the charge separation and aggregation in certain regions of the cloud.

When the local electric field exceeds the dielectric strength of damp air (about 3 MV/m), electrical discharge results in a strike, often followed by commensurate discharges branching from the same path. Mechanisms that cause the charges to build up to lightning are still a matter of scientific investigation. A 2016 study confirmed dielectric breakdown is involved. Lightning may be caused by the circulation of warm moisture-filled air through electric fields. Ice or water particles then accumulate charge as in a Van de Graaff generator.

As a thundercloud moves over the surface of the Earth, an equal electric charge, but of opposite polarity, is induced on the Earth's surface underneath the cloud. The induced positive surface charge, when measured against a fixed point, will be small as the thundercloud approaches, increasing as the center of the storm arrives and dropping as the thundercloud passes. The referential value of the induced surface charge could be roughly represented as a bell curve.

The oppositely charged regions create an electric field within the air between them. This electric field varies in relation to the strength of the surface charge on the base of the thundercloud – the greater the accumulated charge, the higher the electrical field.

=== Electrical discharge as flashes and strikes ===
The charge carrier in lightning is mainly electrons in a plasma. The process of going from charge as ions (positive hydrogen ion and negative hydroxide ion) associated with liquid water or solid water to charge as electrons associated with lightning must involve some form of electro-chemistry, that is, the oxidation and/or the reduction of chemical species.

The best-studied and understood form of lightning is cloud to ground (CG) lightning. Although more common, intra-cloud (IC) and cloud-to-cloud (CC) flashes are difficult to study because there are no fixed points to monitor inside the clouds. Also, because of the very low probability of lightning striking the same point repeatedly and consistently, scientific inquiry is difficult even in areas of high CG frequency.

==== Lightning leaders ====
A downward leader travels towards earth, branching as it goes.

Lightning strike caused by the connection of two leaders, positive shown in blue and negative in red

In a process not well understood, a bidirectional channel of ionized air, called a "leader", is initiated between oppositely-charged regions in a thundercloud. Leaders are electrically conductive channels of ionized gas that propagate through, or are otherwise attracted to, regions with a charge opposite of that of the leader tip. The negative end of the bidirectional leader fills a positive charge region, also called a well, inside the cloud while the positive end fills a negative charge well. Leaders often split, forming branches in a tree-like pattern. In addition, negative and some positive leaders travel in a discontinuous fashion, in a process called "stepping". The resulting jerky movement of the leaders can be readily observed in slow-motion videos of lightning flashes.

It is possible for one end of the leader to fill the oppositely-charged well entirely while the other end is still active. When this happens, the leader end which filled the well may propagate outside of the thundercloud and result in either a cloud-to-air flash or a cloud-to-ground flash. In a typical cloud-to-ground flash, a bidirectional leader initiates between the main negative and lower positive charge regions in a thundercloud. The weaker positive charge region is filled quickly by the negative leader which then propagates toward the inductively-charged ground.

The positively and negatively charged leaders proceed in opposite directions, positive upwards within the cloud and negative towards the earth. Both ionic channels proceed, in their respective directions, in a number of successive spurts. Each leader "pools" ions at the leading tips, shooting out one or more new leaders, momentarily pooling again to concentrate charged ions, then shooting out another leader. The negative leader continues to propagate and split as it heads downward, often speeding up as it gets closer to the Earth's surface.

About 90% of ionic channel lengths between "pools" are approximately 45 m (148 ft) in length. The establishment of the ionic channel takes a comparatively long amount of time (hundreds of milliseconds) in comparison to the resulting discharge, which occurs within a few dozen microseconds. The electric current needed to establish the channel, measured in the tens or hundreds of amperes, is dwarfed by subsequent currents during the actual discharge.

Initiation of the lightning leader is not well understood. The electric field strength within the thundercloud is not typically large enough to initiate this process by itself. Many hypotheses have been proposed. One hypothesis postulates that showers of relativistic electrons are created by cosmic rays and are then accelerated to higher velocities via a process called runaway breakdown. As these relativistic electrons collide and ionize neutral air molecules, they initiate leader formation. Another hypothesis involves locally enhanced electric fields being formed near elongated water droplets or ice crystals. Percolation theory, especially for the case of biased percolation, describes random connectivity phenomena, which produce an evolution of connected structures similar to that of lightning strikes. A streamer avalanche model has recently been favored by observational data taken by LOFAR during storms.

==== Upward streamers ====
When a stepped leader approaches the ground, the presence of opposite charges on the ground enhances the strength of the electric field. The electric field is strongest on grounded objects whose tops are closest to the base of the thundercloud, such as trees and tall buildings. If the electric field is strong enough, a positively charged ionic channel, called a positive or upward streamer, can develop from these points. This was first theorized by Heinz Kasemir.

As negatively charged leaders approach, increasing the localized electric field strength, grounded objects already experiencing corona discharge will exceed a threshold and form upward streamers.

==== Attachment ====
Once a downward leader connects to an available upward leader, a process referred to as attachment, a low-resistance path is formed and discharge may occur. Photographs have been taken in which unattached streamers are clearly visible. The unattached downward leaders are also visible in branched lightning, none of which are connected to the earth, although it may appear they are. High-speed videos can show the attachment process in progress.

==== Discharge – Return stroke ====
High-speed photography showing different parts of a lightning flash during the discharge process as seen in Toulouse, France.

Once a conductive channel bridges the air gap between the negative charge excess in the cloud and the positive surface charge excess below, there is a large drop in resistance across the lightning channel. Electrons accelerate rapidly as a result in a zone beginning at the point of attachment, which expands across the entire leader network at up to one third of the speed of light. This is the "return stroke" and it is the most luminous and noticeable part of the lightning discharge.

A large electric charge flows along the plasma channel, from the cloud to the ground, neutralising the positive ground charge as electrons flow away from the strike point to the surrounding area. This huge surge of current creates large radial voltage differences along the surface of the ground. Called step potentials, they are responsible for more injuries and deaths in groups of people or of other animals than the strike itself. Electricity takes every path available to it. Such step potentials will often cause current to flow through one leg and out another, electrocuting an unlucky human or animal standing near the point where the lightning strikes.

The electric current of the return stroke averages 30 kiloamperes for a typical negative CG flash, often referred to as "negative CG" lightning. In some cases, a ground-to-cloud (GC) lightning flash may originate from a positively charged region on the ground below a storm. These discharges normally originate from the tops of very tall structures, such as communications antennas. The rate at which the return stroke current travels has been found to be around 100,000 km/s (one-third of the speed of light). A typical cloud-to-ground lightning flash culminates in the formation of an electrically conducting plasma channel through the air in excess of 5 km (3.1 mi) tall, from within the cloud to the ground's surface.

The massive flow of electric current occurring during the return stroke combined with the rate at which it occurs (measured in microseconds) rapidly superheats the completed leader channel, forming a highly electrically conductive plasma channel. The core temperature of the plasma during the return stroke may exceed 27,800 °C (50,000 °F), causing it to radiate with a brilliant, blue-white color. Once the electric current stops flowing, the channel cools and dissipates over tens or hundreds of milliseconds, often disappearing as fragmented patches of glowing gas. The nearly instantaneous heating during the return stroke causes the air to expand explosively, producing a powerful shock wave which is heard as thunder.

==== Discharge – Re-strike ====
High-speed videos (examined frame-by-frame) show that most negative CG lightning flashes are made up of 3 or 4 individual strokes, though there may be as many as 30.

Each re-strike is separated by a relatively large amount of time, typically 40 to 50 milliseconds, as other charged regions in the cloud are discharged in subsequent strokes. Re-strikes often cause a noticeable "strobe light" effect.

To understand why multiple return strokes utilize the same lightning channel, one needs to understand the behavior of positive leaders, which a typical ground flash effectively becomes following the negative leader's connection with the ground. Positive leaders decay more rapidly than negative leaders do. For reasons not well understood, bidirectional leaders tend to initiate on the tips of the decayed positive leaders in which the negative end attempts to re-ionize the leader network. These leaders, also called recoil leaders, usually decay shortly after their formation. When they do manage to make contact with a conductive portion of the main leader network, a return stroke-like process occurs and a dart leader travels across all or a portion of the length of the original leader. The dart leaders making connections with the ground are what cause a majority of subsequent return strokes.

Each successive stroke is preceded by intermediate dart leader strokes that have a faster rise time but lower amplitude than the initial return stroke. Each subsequent stroke usually re-uses the discharge channel taken by the previous one, but the channel may be offset from its previous position as wind displaces the hot channel.

Since recoil and dart leader processes do not occur on negative leaders, subsequent return strokes very seldom utilize the same channel on positive ground flashes which are explained later in the article.

==== Discharge – Transient currents during flash ====
The electric current within a typical negative CG lightning discharge rises very quickly to its peak value in 1–10 microseconds, then decays more slowly over 50–200 microseconds. The transient nature of the current within a lightning flash results in several phenomena that need to be addressed in the effective protection of ground-based structures. Rapidly changing (alternating) currents tend to travel on the surface of a conductor, in what is called the skin effect, unlike direct currents, which "flow-through" the entire conductor like water through a hose. Hence, conductors used in the protection of facilities tend to be multi-stranded, with small wires woven together. This increases the total bundle surface area in inverse proportion to the individual strand radius, for a fixed total cross-sectional area.

The rapidly changing currents also create electromagnetic pulses (EMPs) that radiate outward from the ionic channel. This is a characteristic of all electrical discharges. The radiated pulses rapidly weaken as their distance from the origin increases. However, if they pass over conductive elements such as power lines, communication lines, or metallic pipes, they may induce a current which travels outward to its termination. The surge current is inversely related to the surge impedance: the higher in impedance, the lower the current. This is the surge that, more often than not, results in the destruction of delicate electronics, electrical appliances, or electric motors. Devices known as surge protectors (SPD) or transient voltage surge suppressors (TVSS) attached in parallel with these lines can detect the lightning flash's transient irregular current, and, through alteration of its physical properties, route the spike to an attached earthing ground, thereby protecting the equipment from damage.

== Distribution, frequency and properties ==
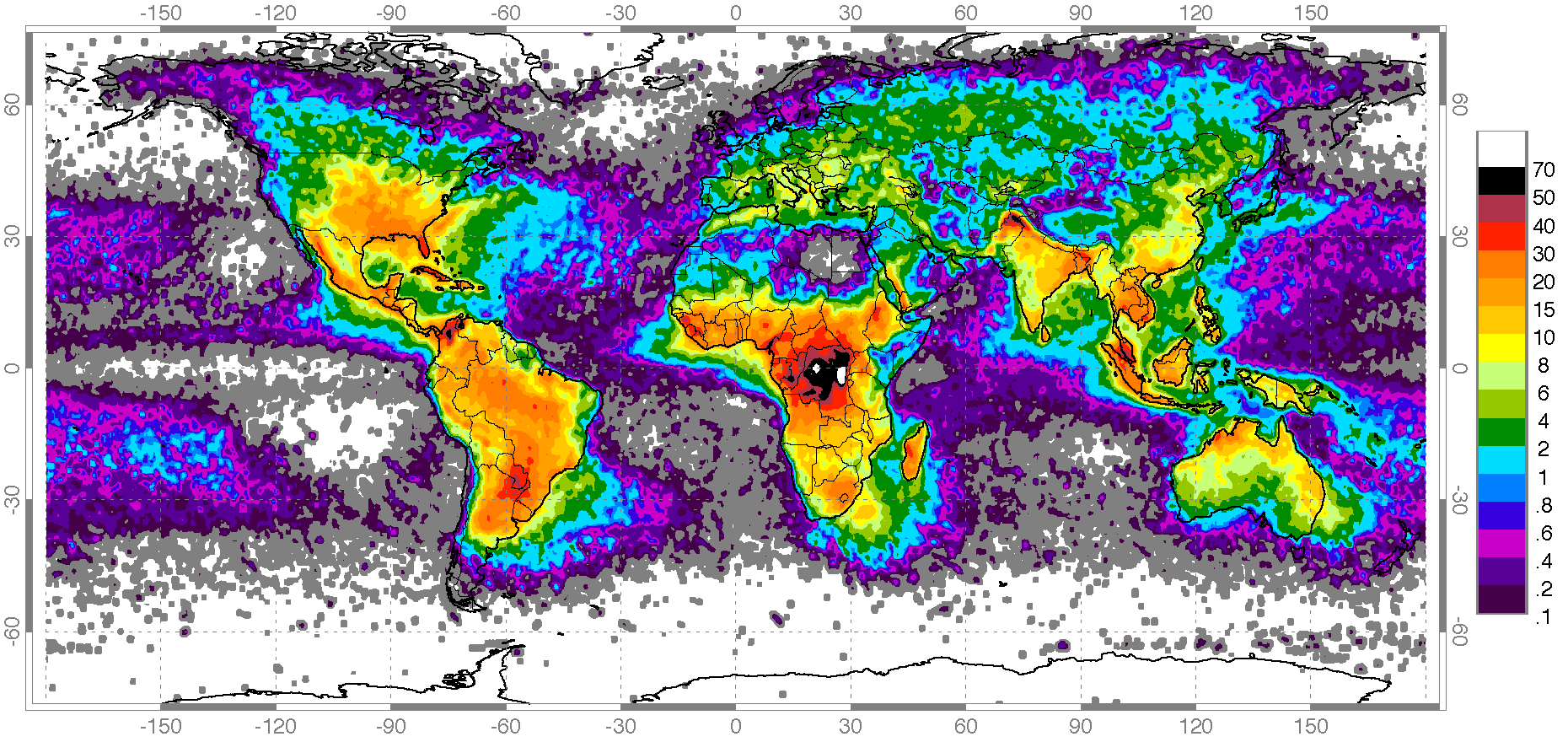
Data obtained from April 1995 to February 2003 from NASA's Optical Transient Detector depicting space-based sensors revealing the uneven distribution of worldwide lightning strikes

A 768 km (477 mi) megaflash from Texas to Louisiana, in the United States.

Global monitoring indicates that lightning on Earth occurs at an average frequency of approximately 44 (± 5) times per second, equating to nearly 1.4 billion flashes per year. Median duration is 0.52 seconds made up from a number of much shorter flashes (strokes) of around 60 to 70 microseconds. Occurrences are distributed unevenly across the planet with about 70% being over land in the tropics where atmospheric convection is the greatest.

Many factors affect the frequency, distribution, strength and physical properties of a typical lightning flash in a particular region of the world. These factors include ground elevation, latitude, prevailing wind currents, relative humidity, and proximity to warm and cold bodies of water.

Lightning is usually produced by cumulonimbus clouds, which have bases that are typically 1–2 km (0.62–1.24 mi) above the ground and tops up to 15 km (9.3 mi) in height.

A lightning strike captured at 240 FPS during a severe thunderstorm in Mango Hill, Australia.

In general, CG lightning flashes account for only 25% of all total lightning flashes worldwide. The proportions of intra-cloud, cloud-to-cloud, and cloud-to-ground lightning may also vary by season at latitude. In the tropics, where the freezing level is generally higher in the atmosphere, only 10% of lightning flashes are CG. At the latitude of Norway (around 60° North latitude), where the freezing elevation is lower, 50% of lightning is CG.

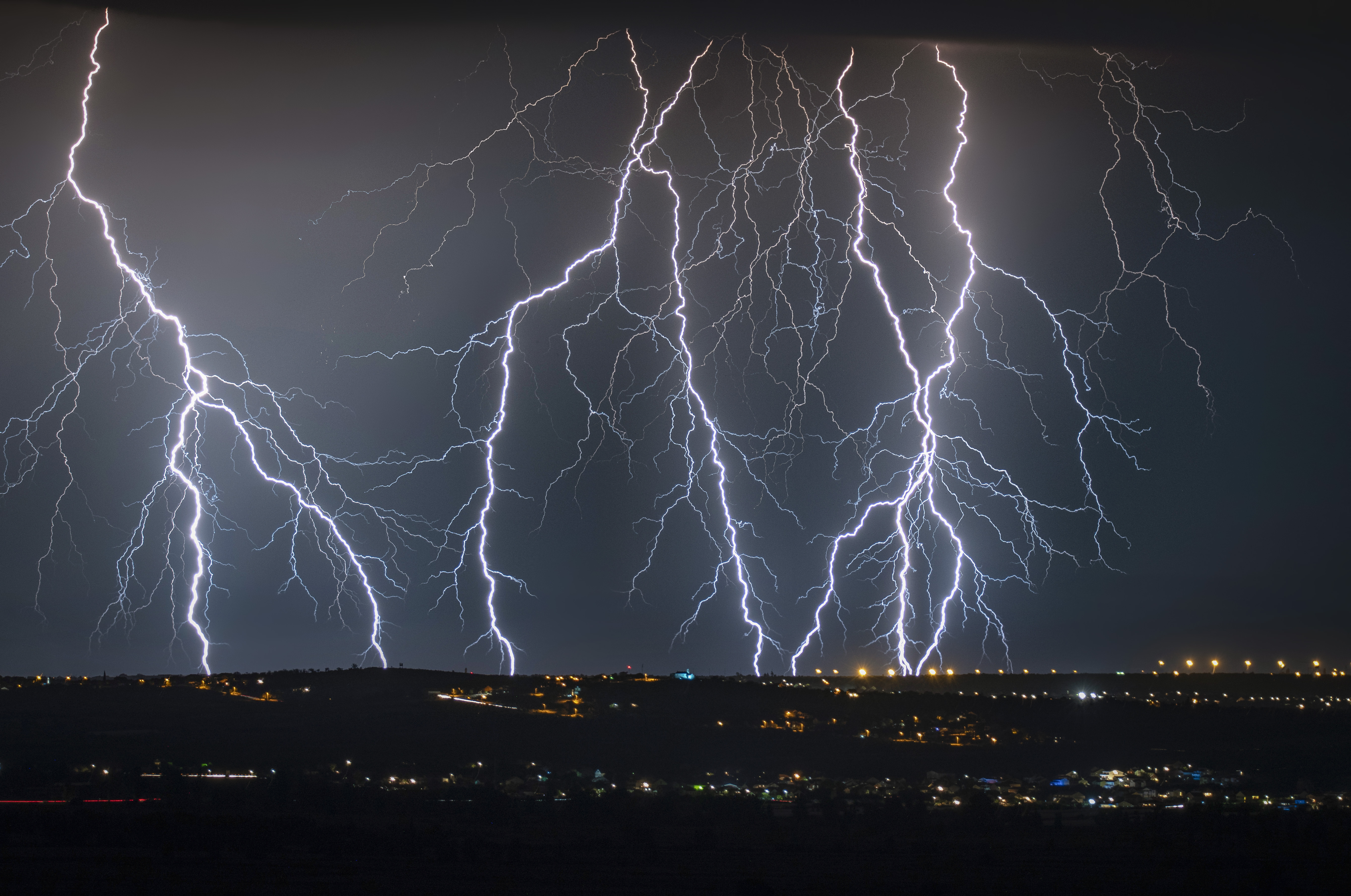
Multiple lightning strikes in Poland in August 2020

The place on Earth where lightning occurs most often is over Lake Maracaibo, wherein the Catatumbo lightning phenomenon produces 250 bolts of lightning a day. This activity occurs on average, 297 days a year. The second most lightning density is near the village of Kifuka in the mountains of the eastern Democratic Republic of the Congo, where the elevation is around 975 m (3,200 ft). On average, this region receives 158 lightning strikes per square kilometre per year (410/sq mi/yr). Other lightning hotspots include Singapore and Lightning Alley in Central Florida.

Researchers at the University of Florida found that the final one-dimensional speeds of 10 flashes observed were between 1.0×10^{5} and 1.4×10^{6} m/s, with an average of 4.4×10^{5} m/s.

=== Megaflashes ===
An unusually long lightning bolt is sometimes called a megaflash. The American Meteorological Society defines a megaflash as "a continuous mesoscale lightning flash with a horizontal path length of approximately 100 km or greater." Because of their long distance the duration of a megaflash is also long, typically more than five seconds. Megaflashes are caused by expansive electrified clouds that discharge slowly; these do not occur in ordinary thunderstorms, only in mesoscale convective systems. As of 2022, megaflashes have been observed only in the Great Plains of North America and the Río de la Plata Basin of South America. This is, in part, because only part of the world is observed with the kind of satellite instrument necessary to detect megaflashes. The launch of the Meteosat Third Generation satellite in 2022 increased that coverage to include Africa and Europe.

According to the World Meteorological Organization, on April 29, 2020, a bolt 768 km (477.2 mi) long was observed in the southern U.S.—sixty km (37 mi) longer than the previous distance record (southern Brazil, October 31, 2018). A single flash in Uruguay and northern Argentina on June 18, 2020, lasted for 17.1 seconds—0.37 seconds longer than the previous record (March 4, 2019, also in northern Argentina). In 2025, scientists discovered the longest observed flash occurred in October 2017 across Texas and Kansas, measuring 829 km (515 mi). The flash, which was detected by NOAA's Geostationary Lightning Mapper, touched ground in five states.

=== Extraterrestrial ===
Lightning has been observed within the atmospheres of planets other than Earth, such as Jupiter, Saturn, and probably Uranus and Neptune. Lightning on Jupiter is far more energetic than on Earth, despite seeming to be generated via the same mechanism. Recently, a new type of lightning was detected on Jupiter, thought to originate from "mushballs" including ammonia. On Saturn, lightning, initially referred to as "Saturn Electrostatic Discharge", was discovered by the Voyager 1 mission.

Lightning on Venus has been a controversial subject after decades of study. During the Soviet Venera and U.S. Pioneer missions of the 1970s and 1980s, signals suggesting lightning may be present in the upper atmosphere were detected. The short Cassini–Huygens mission fly-by of Venus in 1999 detected no signs of lightning, but radio pulses recorded by the spacecraft Venus Express (which began orbiting Venus in April 2006) may originate from lightning on Venus.

In 2025, researchers reported the putative detection of lightning on Mars by a microphone Mars 2020 rover Perseverance. Previous researchers in 2009 had reported the detection of large-scale electric discharge events on Mars, but later researchers could not reproduce their findings.

== Effects ==
A lightning strike can unleash a variety of effects, some temporary, including very brief emission of light, sound and electromagnetic radiation, and some long-lasting, such as death, damage, and atmospheric and environmental changes.

=== Injury, damage and destruction ===
The immense amount of energy transferred in a lightning strike can have potentially devastating effects in a multitude of areas.

==== To nature ====
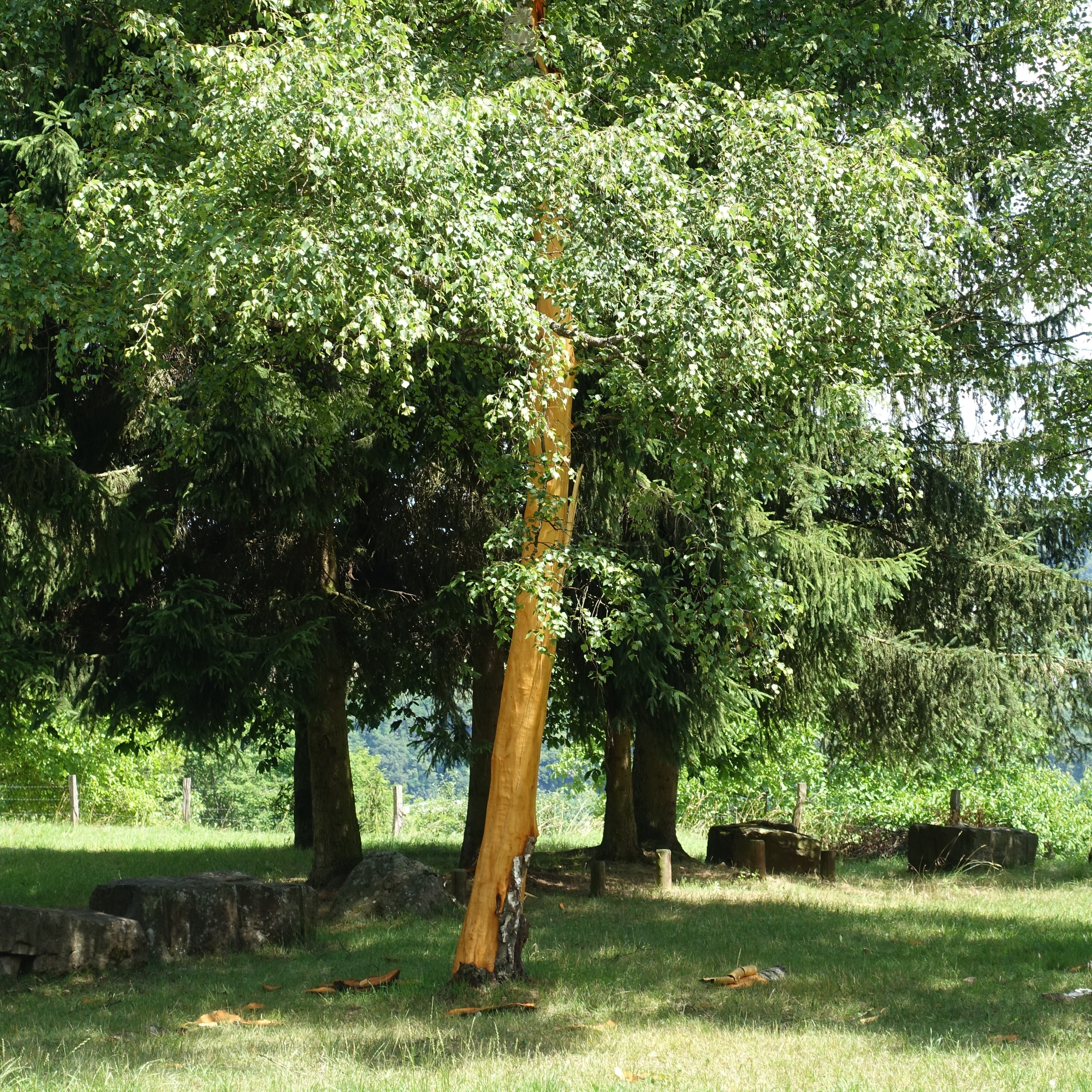
Bark blown off of a Birch tree via explosive steam pressure between the trunk and bark from a lightning strike

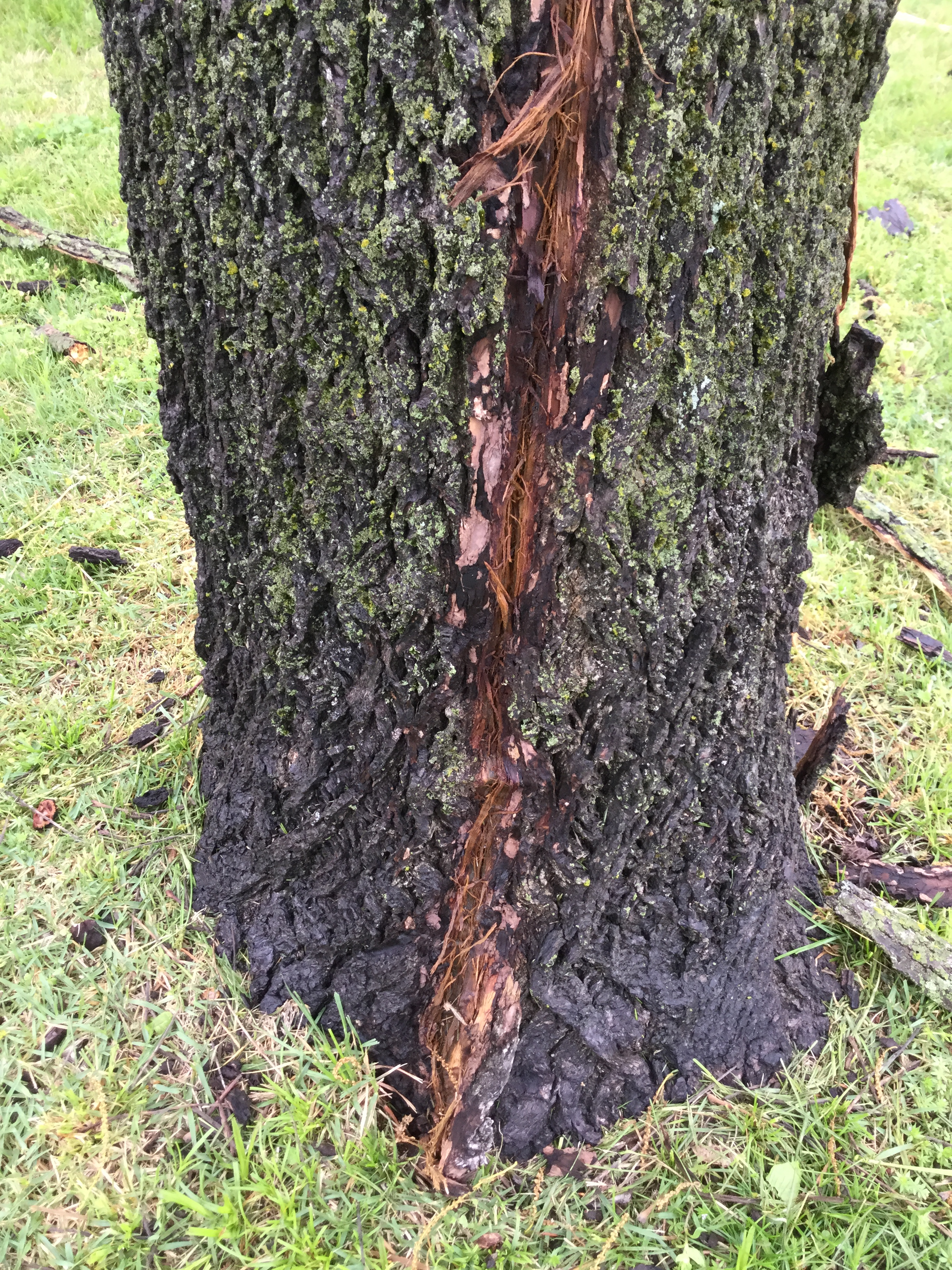
A strike mark on the trunk of a black walnut tree in Oklahoma

Objects struck by lightning experience heat and magnetic forces of great magnitude. Consequently:

- The heat created by lightning currents travelling through a tree may vaporize its sap, causing a steam explosion that rips off bark or even bursts the trunk.
- Similarly water in a fractured rock may be rapidly heated such that it splits further apart.
- A struck tree may catch fire, or a forest fire may be started. See also fire lightning below.
- As lightning travels through sandy soil, the soil surrounding the plasma channel may melt, forming tubular structures called fulgurites.

==== To man-made structures and their contents ====
Buildings or tall structures hit by lightning may be damaged as the lightning seeks unimpeded paths to the ground. By safely conducting a lightning strike to the ground, a lightning protection system, usually incorporating at least one lightning rod, can greatly reduce the probability of severe property damage. Surge protection devices (SPDs) can additionally or alternatively be used to help protect electrical installations from lightning induced electrical surges that risk damaging or destroying electrical equipment or starting a fire. Electrical fires obviously threaten not only structures but all assets, personal possessions, and living beings (people, pets and livestock) within. What, if any, protection system a building or structure requires is determined through a risk assessment. Threats to structures come not only from direct strikes to the structure itself, but also from direct or indirect strikes to connected electrically conductive services (electrical power lines; communication lines; water/gas pipes), or even to the surrounding area from which a surge may reach a service connection as it spreads out into the ground.

==== To aircraft ====
Aircraft are highly susceptible to being struck due to their metallic fuselages, but lightning strikes are generally not dangerous to them. Due to the conductive properties of aluminium alloy, the fuselage acts as a Faraday cage. Present day aircraft are built to be safe from a lightning strike and passengers will generally not even know that it has happened. However, there have been suspicions that lightning strikes can ignite fuel vapor and cause explosion, and nearby lightning can momentarily blind the pilot and cause permanent errors in magnetic compasses.

==== To living beings ====
Although 90 percent of people struck by lightning survive, humans and other animals struck by lightning may suffer severe injury due to internal organ and nervous system damage.

=== Noise (thunder) ===
Because the electrostatic discharge of terrestrial lightning superheats the air to plasma temperatures along the length of the discharge channel in a short duration, kinetic theory dictates gaseous molecules undergo a rapid increase in pressure and thus expand outward from the lightning creating a shock wave audible as thunder. Since the sound waves propagate not from a single point source but along the length of the lightning's path, the sound origin's varying distances from the observer can generate a rolling or rumbling effect. Perception of the sonic characteristics is further complicated by factors such as the irregular and possibly branching geometry of the lightning channel, by acoustic echoing from terrain, and by the usually multiple-stroke characteristic of the lightning strike. Thunder is heard as a rolling, gradually dissipating rumble because the sound from different portions of a long stroke arrives at slightly different times.

Lightning at a sufficient distance may be seen and not heard; there is data that a lightning storm can be seen at over 160 km (100 miles) whereas the thunder travels about 32 km (20 miles). Anecdotally, there are many examples of people describing a 'storm directly overhead' or 'all-around' and yet 'no thunder'. Since thunderclouds can be up to 20 km (12 miles) high, lightning occurring high up in the cloud may appear close but is actually too far away to produce noticeable thunder.

==== The distance approximation trick ====
Light travels at about 300,000,000 m/s (980,000,000 ft/s), while sound only travels through air at about 343 m/s (1,130 ft/s). An observer can approximate the distance to the strike by timing the interval between the visible lightning and the audible thunder it generates. A lightning flash preceding its thunder by one second would be approximately 343 m (0.213 miles) away; thus a delay of three seconds would indicate a distance of about 1 km (0.62 miles); while a flash preceding thunder by five seconds would indicate a distance of roughly 1 mile (1.6 km). Consequently, a lightning strike observed at a very close distance will be accompanied by a sudden clap of thunder, with almost no perceptible time lapse, possibly accompanied by the smell of ozone (O_{3}).

=== Electromagnetic radiation and interference ===
Electromagnetic waves are emitted in a variety of wavelengths, most obviously that of visible light – the big bright flash. This emitted radiation results partly from black-body radiation due to the temperature increase caused by electrical resistance of the air, and partly for other reasons that are still being actively researched.

==== Radio frequency radiation ====
Lightning discharges generate radio-frequency electromagnetic waves which can be received thousands of kilometers from their source. The discharge by itself is relatively simple short-lived dipole source that creates a single electromagnetic pulse with a duration of about 1 ms and a wide spectral density. In the absence in the nearby environment of materials with magnetic or electrical interaction properties, at a large distances in a far field zone, the electromagnetic wave will be proportional to the second derivation of the discharge current. This is what happens with high-altitude discharges or discharges over areas of a dry land. In other cases, the surrounding environment will change the shape of the source signal by absorbing some of its spectrum and converting it into a heat or re-transmitting it back as modified electromagnetic waves.

==== High-energy radiation ====
The production of X-rays by a bolt of lightning was predicted as early as 1925 by C.T.R. Wilson. No evidence was found until 2001-2002, when researchers at the New Mexico Institute of Mining and Technology detected X-ray emissions from an induced lightning strike along a grounded wire trailed behind a rocket shot into a storm cloud. In the same year, University of Florida and Florida Tech researchers used an array of electric field and X-ray detectors at a lightning research facility in North Florida to confirm that natural lightning makes X-rays in large quantities during the propagation of stepped leaders. The cause of the X-ray emissions was left as a matter for further research, as the temperature of lightning is too low to account for the X-rays observed. The relativistic runaway electron avalanche mechanism explains both the emission of X-rays and the initiation of lightning flashes.

A number of observations by space-based telescopes have revealed even higher energy gamma ray emissions, the so-called terrestrial gamma-ray flashes (TGFs). These observations posed a challenge to then-current theories of lightning, especially with the 2000s discovery of clear signatures of antimatter produced in lightning. Research in the 2010s has shown that secondary species, produced by these TGFs, such as electrons, positrons, neutrons or protons, can gain energies of up to several tens of MeV.

=== Environmental changes ===
More permanent or longer-lasting environmental changes include the following.

==== Atmospheric chemistry ====
The very high temperatures generated by lightning lead to significant local increases in ozone and oxides of nitrogen. Each lightning flash in temperate and sub-tropical areas produces 7 kg of NO_{x} on average. In the troposphere the effect of lightning can increase NO_{x} by 90% and ozone by 30%.

==== Ground fertilisation ====
Lightning serves an important role in the nitrogen cycle by oxidizing diatomic nitrogen in the air into nitrates which are deposited by rain and can fertilize the growth of plants and other organisms.

==== Induced permanent magnetism ====
The movement of electrical charges produces a magnetic field (see electromagnetism). The intense currents of a lightning discharge create a fleeting but very strong magnetic field. Where the lightning current path passes through rock, soil, or metal these materials can become permanently magnetized. This effect is known as lightning-induced remanent magnetism, or LIRM. These currents follow the least resistive path, often horizontally near the surface but sometimes vertically, where faults, ore bodies, or ground water offers a less resistive path. One theory suggests that lodestones, natural magnets encountered in ancient times, were created in this manner.

Lightning-induced magnetic anomalies can be mapped in the ground, and analysis of magnetized materials can confirm lightning was the source of the magnetization and provide an estimate of the peak current of the lightning discharge.

=== Magnetic hallucinations ===
Research at the University of Innsbruck has calculated that magnetic fields generated by plasma may induce hallucinations in subjects located within 200 m (660 ft) of a severe lightning storm, similar to the effects of transcranial magnetic stimulation (TMS).

== Detection and monitoring ==
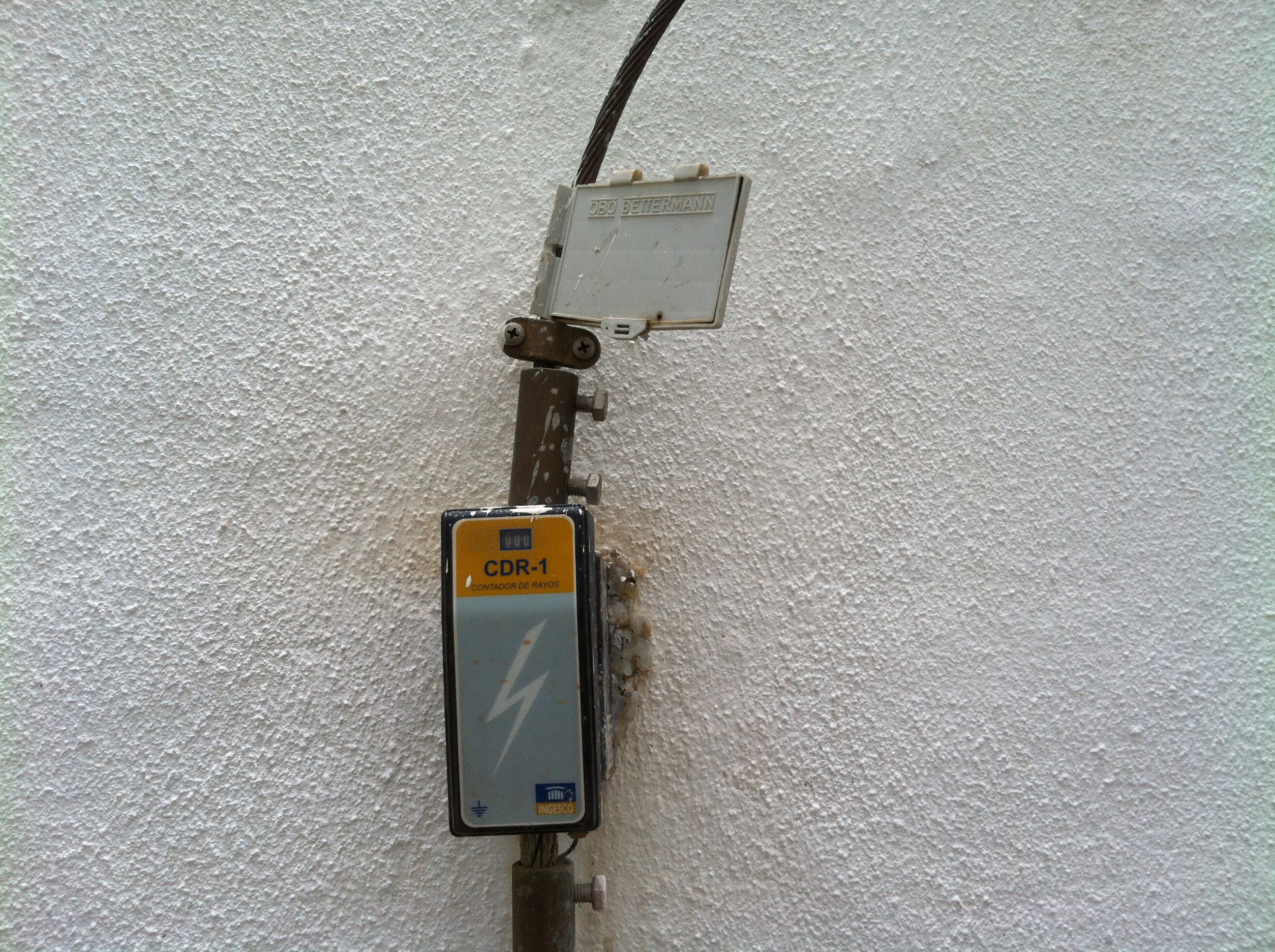
Lightning strike counter in a museum

The earliest detector invented to warn of the approach of a thunderstorm was the lightning bell. Benjamin Franklin installed one such device in his house. The detector was based on an electrostatic device called the 'electric chimes' invented by Andrew Gordon in 1742.

Lightning discharges generate a wide range of electromagnetic radiations, including radio-frequency pulses. The Earth-ionosphere waveguide traps electromagnetic VLF- and ELF waves. Electromagnetic pulses transmitted by lightning strikes propagate within that waveguide. The waveguide is dispersive, which means that their group velocity depends on frequency. The difference of the group time delay of a lightning pulse at adjacent frequencies is proportional to the distance between transmitter and receiver. Together with direction-finding methods, this allows locating lightning strikes up to distances of 10,000 km from their origin. Moreover, the eigenfrequencies of the Earth-ionospheric waveguide, the Schumann resonances at about 7.5 Hz, are used to determine the global thunderstorm activity.

A number of countries have installed nationwide lightning detector networks. The United States federal government has constructed a nationwide grid of such lightning detectors, allowing lightning discharges to be tracked in real time throughout the continental U.S. The EUCLID detection network is a combination of several national networks across Europe. Other examples of nations with lightning detection networks are India and Brazil.

There are a range of global detection networks, which vary in their commercial and academic principles. Blitzortung (a private global detection system that consists of over 500 detection stations owned and operated by hobbyists/volunteers) provides near real-time lightning maps. The World Wide Lightning Location Network (WWLLN) is an academic led detection system. The Vaisala GLD360 network is a private enterprise.

In addition to ground-based lightning detection, several instruments aboard satellites have been constructed to observe lightning distribution. Some of the first satellite-based observations were made in the late 1970s. The global and tropical long-term climatology of lightning has been observed by the Optical Transient Detector (OTD), aboard the OrbView-1 satellite launched on April 3, 1995, and the subsequent Lightning Imaging Sensor (LIS) aboard TRMM launched on November 28, 1997. In addition, the ISS carried a LIS instrument for three years from March 2017.

Starting in 2016, the National Oceanic and Atmospheric Administration launched Geostationary Operational Environmental Satellite–R Series (GOES-R) weather satellites outfitted with Geostationary Lightning Mapper (GLM) instruments which are near-infrared optical transient detectors that can detect the momentary changes in an optical scene, indicating the presence of lightning. The lightning detection data can be converted into a real-time map of lightning activity across the Western Hemisphere; this mapping technique has been implemented by the United States National Weather Service. At the end of 2022, EUMETSAT launched the Lightning Imager (MTG-LI) on board the Meteosat Third Generation. This complements NOAA's GLM as MTG-LI will observe Europe and Africa.

=== Artificial triggering ===
- Rocket-triggered
  Lightning can be "triggered" by launching specially designed rockets trailing spools of wire into thunderstorms. The wire unwinds as the rocket ascends, creating an elevated ground that can attract descending leaders. If a leader attaches, the wire provides a low-resistance pathway for a lightning flash to occur. The wire is vaporized by the return current flow, creating a straight lightning plasma channel in its place. This method allows for scientific research of lightning to occur under a more controlled and predictable manner. The International Center for Lightning Research and Testing (ICLRT) at Camp Blanding, Florida typically uses rocket triggered lightning in their research studies.
- Laser-triggered
  Since the 1970s, researchers have attempted to trigger lightning strikes by means of infrared or ultraviolet lasers, which create a channel of ionized gas through which the lightning would be conducted to ground. Such triggering of lightning is intended to protect rocket launching pads, electric power facilities, and other sensitive targets.
  In New Mexico, U.S., scientists tested a new terawatt laser which provoked lightning. Scientists fired ultra-fast pulses from an extremely powerful laser thus sending several terawatts into the clouds to call down electrical discharges in storm clouds over the region. The laser beams sent from the laser make channels of ionized molecules known as filaments. Before the lightning strikes earth, the filaments lead electricity through the clouds, playing the role of lightning rods. Researchers generated filaments that lived a period too short to trigger a real lightning strike. Nevertheless, a boost in electrical activity within the clouds was registered. According to the French and German scientists who ran the experiment, the fast pulses sent from the laser will be able to provoke lightning strikes on demand. Statistical analysis showed that their laser pulses indeed enhanced the electrical activity in the thundercloud where it was aimed—in effect they generated small local discharges located at the position of the plasma channels.

== Impact of climate change and air pollution ==
It is difficult to accurately predict changes in lightning due to climate change because it is challenging to simulate cloud physics variables that predict lightning (such as convection and cloud ice) in climate models.

A large share of the world's lightning occurs over Africa. While there are regional variations in how climate change affects lightning across the continent, one study predicts a small increase in the total amount of lightning across the continent with warming. More specifically, the total number of lightning days per year is predicted to decrease, while more cloud ice and stronger convection leads to more lightning strikes occurring on days when lightning does occur.

Lightning is much less common near the North and South Poles than in other regions. However, observations are beginning to show that lightning in the Arctic is increasing. and models suggest that climate change will continue to increase the frequency of lightning in the Arctic in future. The ratio of Arctic summertime lightning strikes has increased from 2010 to 2020 compared to the total lightning strikes in the world, indicating that the region is becoming more influenced by lightning.

Lightning activity is increased by particulate emissions (a form of air pollution). However, this only occurs up to a point (aerosol optical depth = 0.3). Once this threshold is crossed, lightning is then suppressed by further increases in particulates.

When lightning occurs, it generates rapid heating causing nitrogen and oxygen molecules in the atmosphere to break apart. This process leads to the formation of nitrogen oxides (NO_{x}), which can subsequently result in the production of ozone, a greenhouse gas when occurring in the troposphere. However, lightning NOx also leads to increased amounts of hydroxyl (OH) and hydroperoxyl (HO_{2}) radicals. These reactive molecules initiate chemical reactions that break down greenhouse gases like methane, effectively cleaning the atmosphere.

=== Lightning and climate change feedbacks ===
As lightning is influenced by climate change, there is a corresponding change to the lightning's influence on climate. These changes can lead to further climate change, thus creating a climate change feedback.

Lightning leads to the production of tropospheric ozone and destruction of methane, both greenhouse gases and air pollutants. Therefore, the net impact of lightning on climate depends on the balance between this warming and cooling effect of the gases' effects on atmospheric chemistry. Predictions of this feedback can vary, resulting in either no change (net zero feedback), or a warming effect (positive feedback), depending on the method used to predict lightning.

Lightning is the major natural cause of wildfire, estimated to cause 10% of forest fires worldwide. Wildfire can contribute to climate change. Because wildfires emit greenhouse gases, and also affect vegetation cover (which affects how much sunlight is reflected), a lightning-wildfire feedback is possible. Multiple studies suggest there could be an increase in Boreal and Arctic lightning-ignited fires in response to climate change. There is evidence that arctic lightning wildfire feedback may also influence vegetation and permafrost cover. The impact of lightning on fires in the tropics remains uncertain.

== In culture ==
The first known photograph of lightning is from 1847, by Thomas Martin Easterly. The first surviving photograph is from 1882, by William Nicholson Jennings.

=== Religion and mythology ===
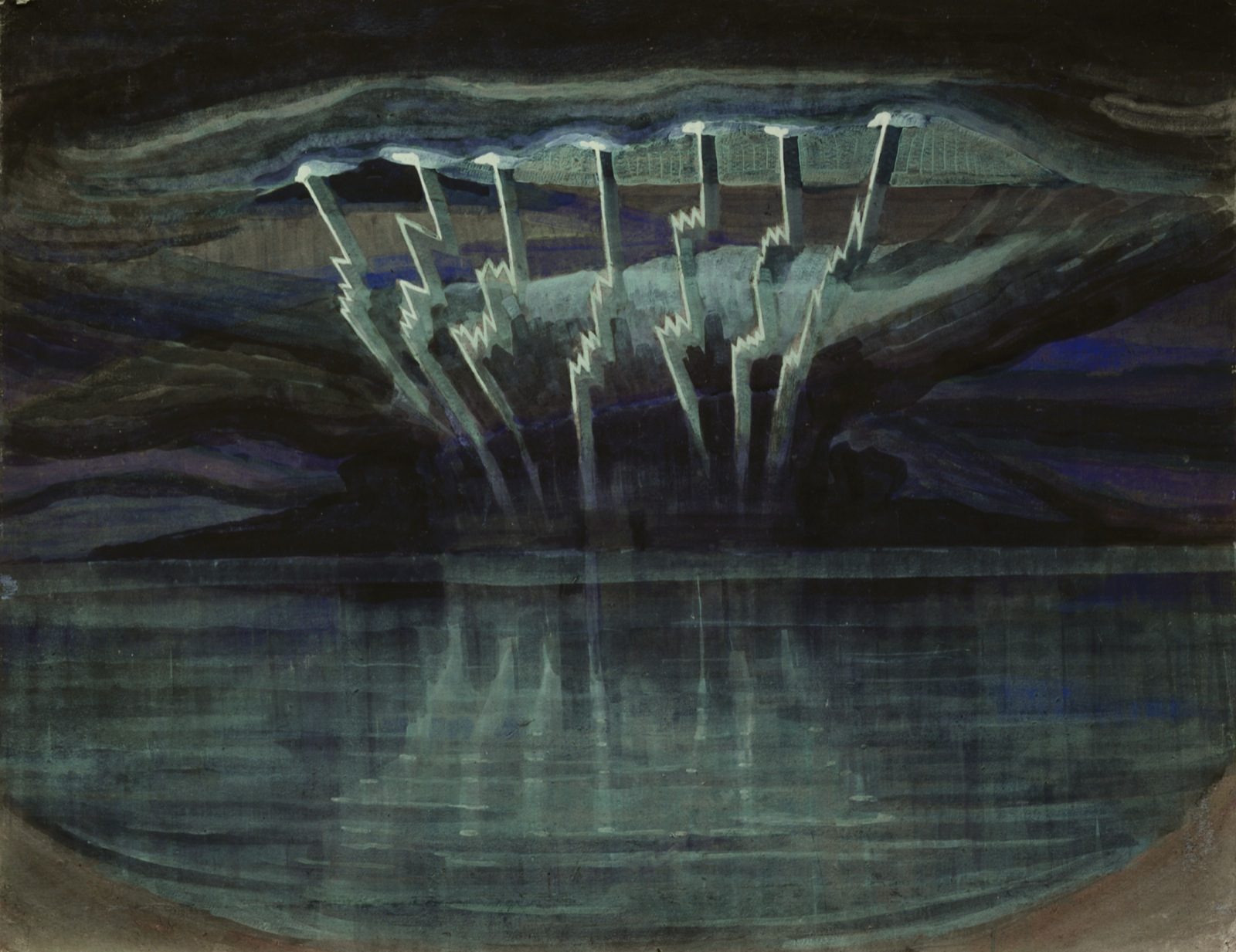
Lightning by Mikalojus Konstantinas Ciurlionis (1909)

In many cultures, lightning has been viewed as a sign or part of a deity or a deity in and of itself. These include the Greek god Zeus, the Aztec god Tlaloc, the Mayan God K, Slavic mythology's Perun, the Baltic Pērkons/Perkūnas, Thor in Norse mythology, Ukko in Finnish mythology, the Hindu god Indra, the Yoruba god Sango, Illapa in Inca mythology and the Shinto god Raijin. The ancient Etruscans produced guides to divining the future based on the omens supposedly displayed by thunder or lightning. Such use of thunder and lightning in divination is also known as ceraunoscopy, a kind of aeromancy. In the traditional religion of the African Bantu tribes, lightning is a sign of the ire of the gods. Scriptures in Judaism, Islam and Christianity also ascribe supernatural importance to lightning.

=== In popular culture ===
Although sometimes used figuratively, the idea that lightning never strikes the same place twice is a common myth. In fact, lightning can, and often does, strike the same place more than once. Lightning in a thunderstorm is more likely to strike objects and spots that are more prominent or conductive. For instance, lightning strikes the Empire State Building in New York City on average 23 times per year.

The superheroes the Flash and Shazam have a lightning bolt as part of their official logo.

In French and Italian, the expression for "Love at first sight" is coup de foudre and colpo di fulmine, respectively, which literally translated means "lightning strike".

=== Political and military culture ===
Two lightning bolts pictured in the former coat of arms of the Yli-Ii municipality

The bolt of lightning in heraldry is called a thunderbolt. This symbol usually represents power and speed.

Some political parties use lightning flashes as a symbol of power, such as the People's Action Party in Singapore, the British Union of Fascists during the 1930s, and the National States' Rights Party in the United States during the 1950s. The Schutzstaffel, the paramilitary wing of the Nazi Party, used the Sig rune in their logo which symbolizes lightning. The German word Blitzkrieg, which means "lightning war", was a major offensive strategy of the German army during World War II.

The lightning bolt is a common insignia for military communications units. A lightning bolt is also the NATO symbol for a signal asset.

== See also ==
- Lightning strike
- Volcanic lightning
- Paleolightning
- Harvesting lightning energy
- Keraunography
- Keraunomedicine – medical study of lightning casualties
- Lichtenberg figure
- Lightning injury
- Lightning-prediction system
- Roy Sullivan – Sullivan is recognized by Guinness World Records as the person struck by lightning more recorded times than any other human
- St. Elmo's fire
- Upper-atmospheric lightning
- Vela satellites – satellites which could record lightning superbolts
