= Upper-atmospheric lightning =

Rare transient luminous events that occur over tops of thunder storms

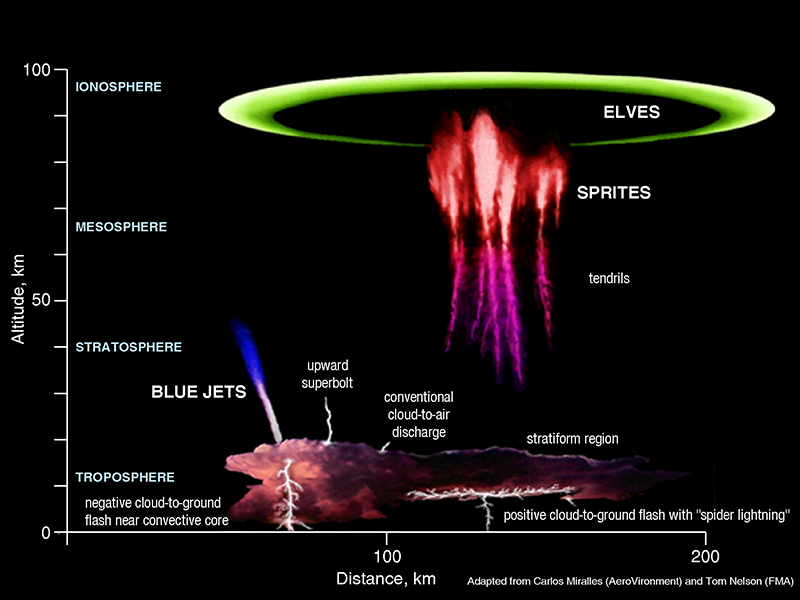
Representation of upper-atmospheric lightning and electrical-discharge phenomena

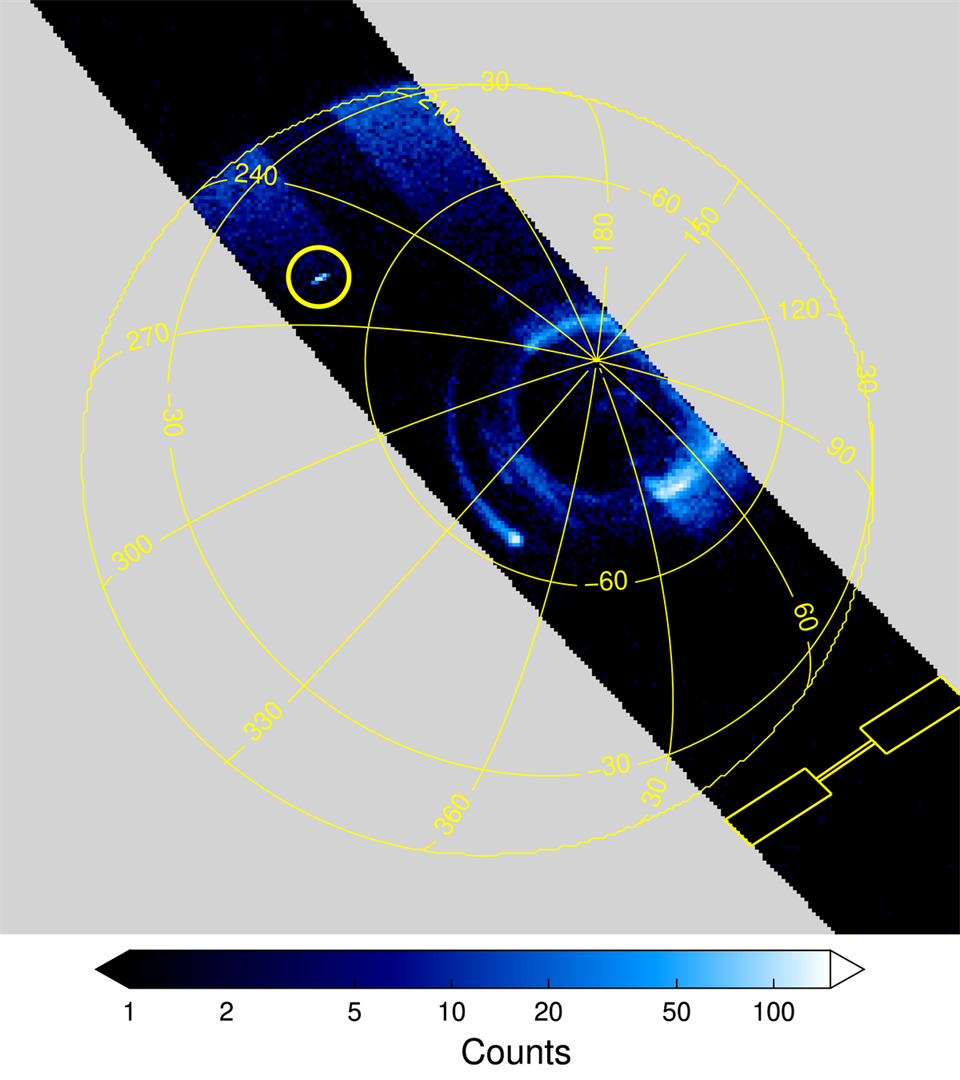
Discovery image of a TLE on Jupiter by the NASA Juno probe.

Upper-atmospheric lightning and ionospheric lightning are short-lived electrical-breakdown phenomena that occur well above the altitudes of normal lightning and storm clouds. Upper-atmospheric lightning is believed to be an electrically induced form of luminous plasma. The preferred scientific term is transient luminous event (TLE), because the various types of electrical-discharge phenomena in the upper atmosphere lack several characteristics of the more familiar tropospheric lightning.

Transient luminous events have also been observed in far-ultraviolet images of Jupiter's upper atmosphere, high above the altitude of lightning-producing water clouds.

== Characteristics ==
There are several types of TLEs, the most well-known being sprites. Sprites are flashes of bright red light that occur above storm systems. C-sprites (short for "columniform sprites") is the name given to vertical columns of red light. C-sprites exhibiting tendrils are sometimes called "carrot sprites". Other types of TLEs include sprite halos, ghosts, blue jets, gigantic jets, pixies, gnomes, trolls, blue starters, sprelves and ELVESs. The acronym ELVES ("emission of light and very low frequency perturbations due to electromagnetic pulse sources") refers to a singular event which is commonly thought of as being plural. TLEs are secondary phenomena that occur in the upper atmosphere in association with underlying thunderstorm lightning. TLEs can last anywhere from a millisecond or less to 2 seconds or more.

TLEs have been captured by a variety of optical recording systems, with the total number of recent recorded events (early 2009) estimated at many tens-of-thousands. The global rate of TLE occurrence has been estimated from satellite (FORMOSAT-2) observations to be several million events per year.

== History ==
In the 1920s, the Scottish physicist C.T.R. Wilson predicted that electrical breakdown should occur in the atmosphere high above large thunderstorms. In ensuing decades, high altitude electrical discharges were reported by aircraft pilots and discounted by meteorologists.

The first video recording of a TLE was captured on July 6, 1989, by a team of researchers from the University of Minnesota conducting observations of the night sky as part of the SKYFLASH program from a site located about 37 mi (60 km) northeast of Minneapolis–St. Paul. The team were testing a low-light level television camera, recording at 60 frames per second, and while pointing it north captured two frames of a pair of flashes shooting upwards from the cloud tops, later determined to have originated from a storm about 160 mi (250 km) north of the observation site. The next known recordings of a TLE were taken on October 21, 1989, during orbits 44 and 45 of Space Shuttle mission STS-34, which was conducting the Mesoscale Lightning Observation Experiment.

Several years later, the optical signatures of these events were named 'sprites' by researchers to avoid inadvertently implying physical properties that were, at the time, still unknown. The terms red sprites and blue jets gained popularity after a video clip was circulated following a 1994 aircraft research campaign to study the phenomenon.

== Sprites ==
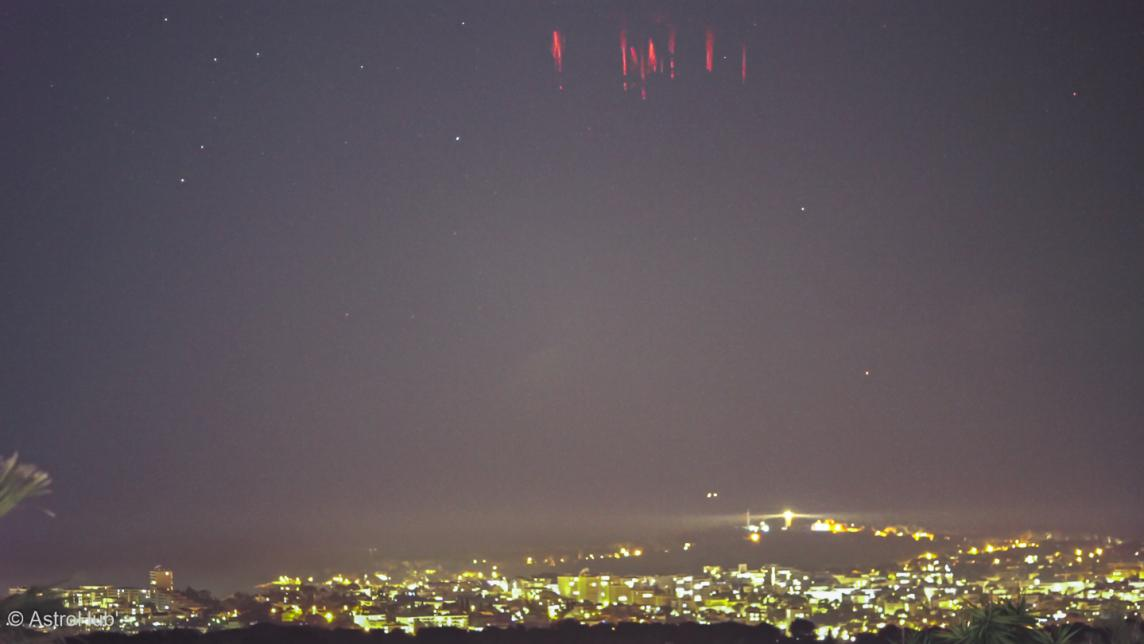
Sprites above Rome seen from Antibes

Sprites are large-scale electrical discharges which occur high above a thunderstorm cloud, or cumulonimbus, giving rise to a quite varied range of visual shapes. They are triggered by the discharges of positive lightning between the thundercloud and the ground. The phenomenon was named after the mischievous sprite, e.g., Shakespeare's Ariel or Puck, and is also a backronym for "stratospheric/mesospheric perturbations resulting from intense thunderstorm electrification". They are normally colored reddish-orange or greenish-blue, with hanging tendrils below and arcing branches above. They can also be preceded by a reddish halo, known as a sprite halo. They often occur in clusters, reaching 50 to 90 kilometres (31 to 56 mi) above the Earth's surface. Sprites have been witnessed thousands of times. Sprites have been held responsible for otherwise unexplained accidents involving high-altitude vehicular operations above thunderstorms.

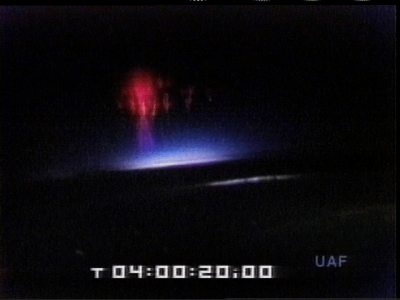

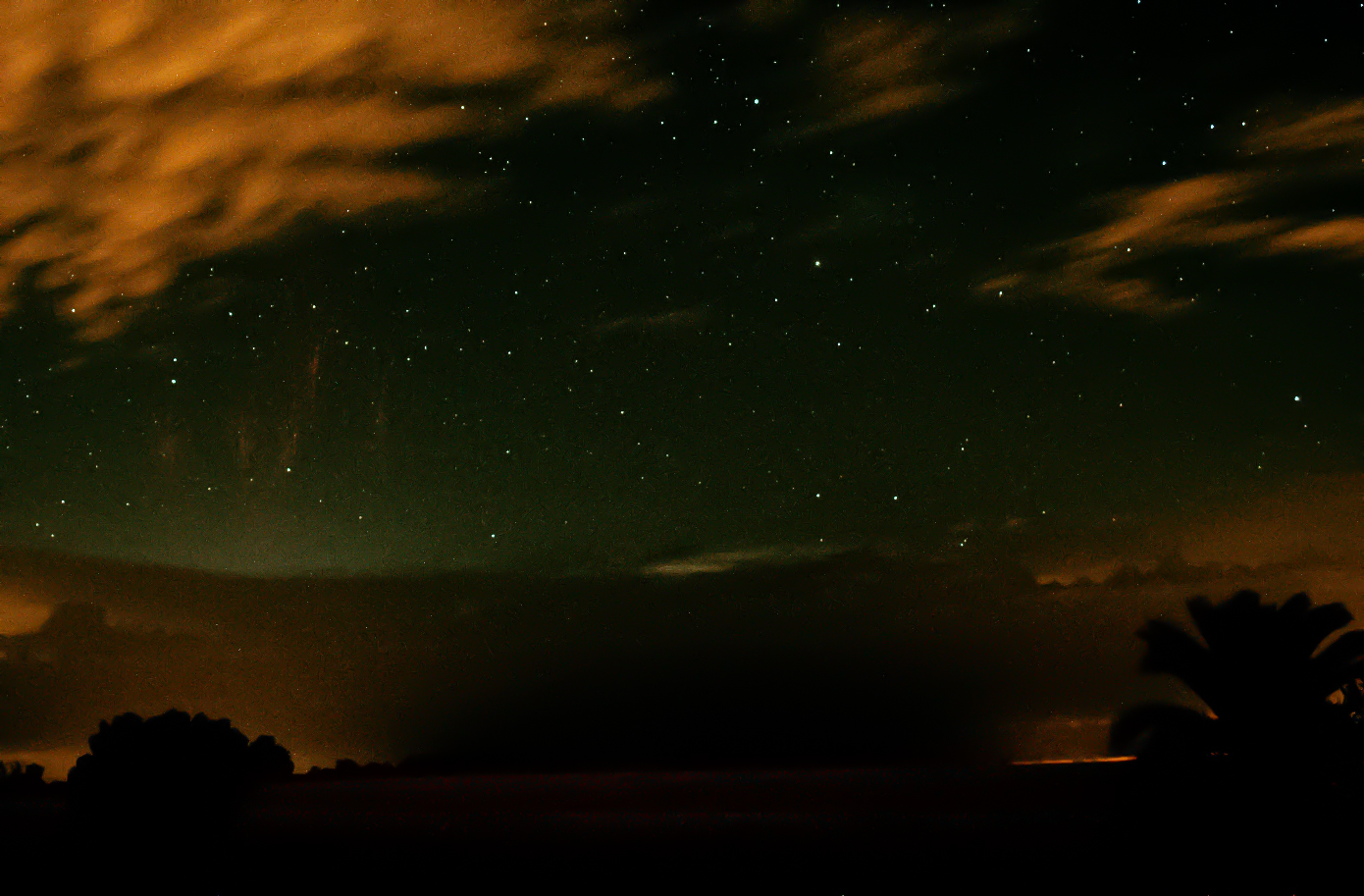

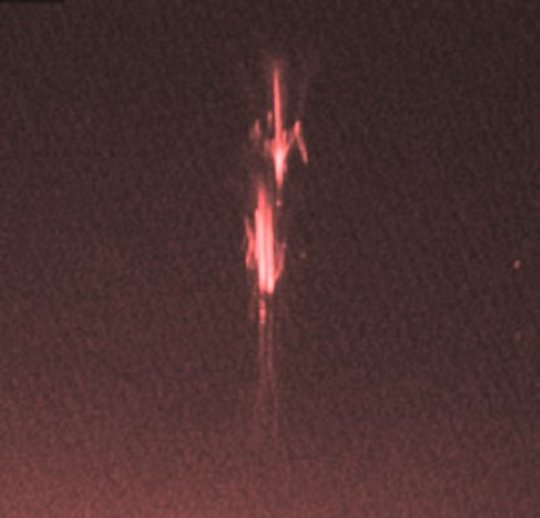

== Jets ==
Although jets are considered to be a type of upper-atmospheric lightning, it has been found that they are components of tropospheric lightning and a type of cloud-to-air discharge that initiates within a thunderstorm and travels upwards. In contrast, other types of TLEs are not electrically connected with tropospheric lightning—despite being triggered by it. The two main types of jets are blue jets and gigantic jets. Blue starters are considered to be a weaker form of blue jets.

=== Blue jets ===
Real-time footage of a blue jet over India, captured by ESA astronaut Andreas Mogensen aboard the ISS.

Blue jets emanate upwards from cloud tops at speeds of about 100–140 km/s (60–90 mi/s) and have a conical shape extending up to around 50 km (30 mi) in altitude, lasting 200 to 300 milliseconds. They are also brighter than sprites and, as implied by their name, are blue in color. The color is believed to be due to a set of blue and near-ultraviolet emission lines from neutral and ionized molecular nitrogen. Blue jets are believed to be initiated as "normal" lightning discharges between the upper positive charge region in a thundercloud and a negative "screening layer" present above this charge region. The positive end of the leader network fills the negative charge region before the negative end fills the positive charge region, and the positive leader subsequently exits the cloud and propagates upward. Blue jets are mainly generated by thunderstorms with high rates of negative cloud-to-ground lightning. It was previously believed that blue jets were not directly related to lightning flashes, and that the presence of hail somehow led to their occurrence. They were first recorded on October 21, 1989, on a monochrome video of a thunderstorm on the horizon taken from the Space Shuttle as it passed over Australia. Blue jets occur much less frequently than sprites. By 2007, fewer than a hundred images had been obtained. The majority of these images, which include the first color imagery, are associated with a single thunderstorm. These were taken in a series of 1994 aircraft flights to study sprites. More recently, the source and formation of blue jets has been observed from the International Space Station.

=== Blue starters ===
Blue starters were discovered on video from a night time research flight around thunderstorms and appear to be "an upward moving luminous phenomenon closely related to blue jets." They appear to be shorter and brighter than blue jets, reaching altitudes of only up to 20 km (12 mi). "Blue starters appear to be blue jets that never quite make it," according to Dr. Victor P. Pasko, associate professor of electrical engineering.

=== Gigantic jets ===
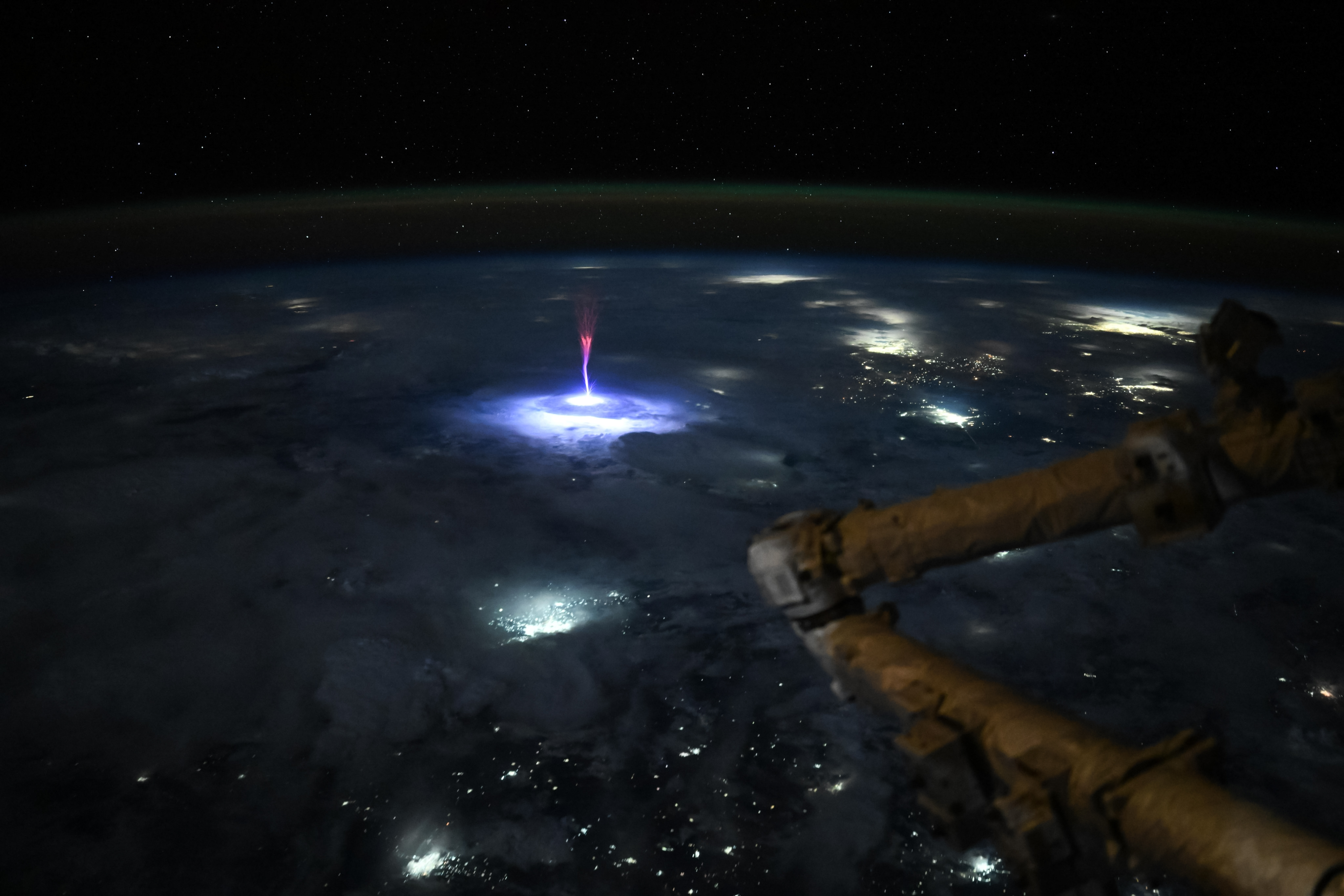
A gigantic jet photographed from the International Space Station on July 3, 2025

Where blue jets are believed to initiate between the upper positive charge region and a negative screening layer directly above this region, gigantic jets appear to initiate as an intracloud flash between the middle negative and upper positive charge regions in the thundercloud. The negatively charged leader then escapes upward from the cloud toward the ionosphere before it can discharge within the cloud. Gigantic jets reach higher altitudes than blue jets, terminating at 90 km (56 mi). While they may appear to be visually similar to carrot-type sprites, gigantic jets differ in that they are not associated with cloud to ground lightning and propagate upward from the cloud at a slower rate.

==== Observations ====
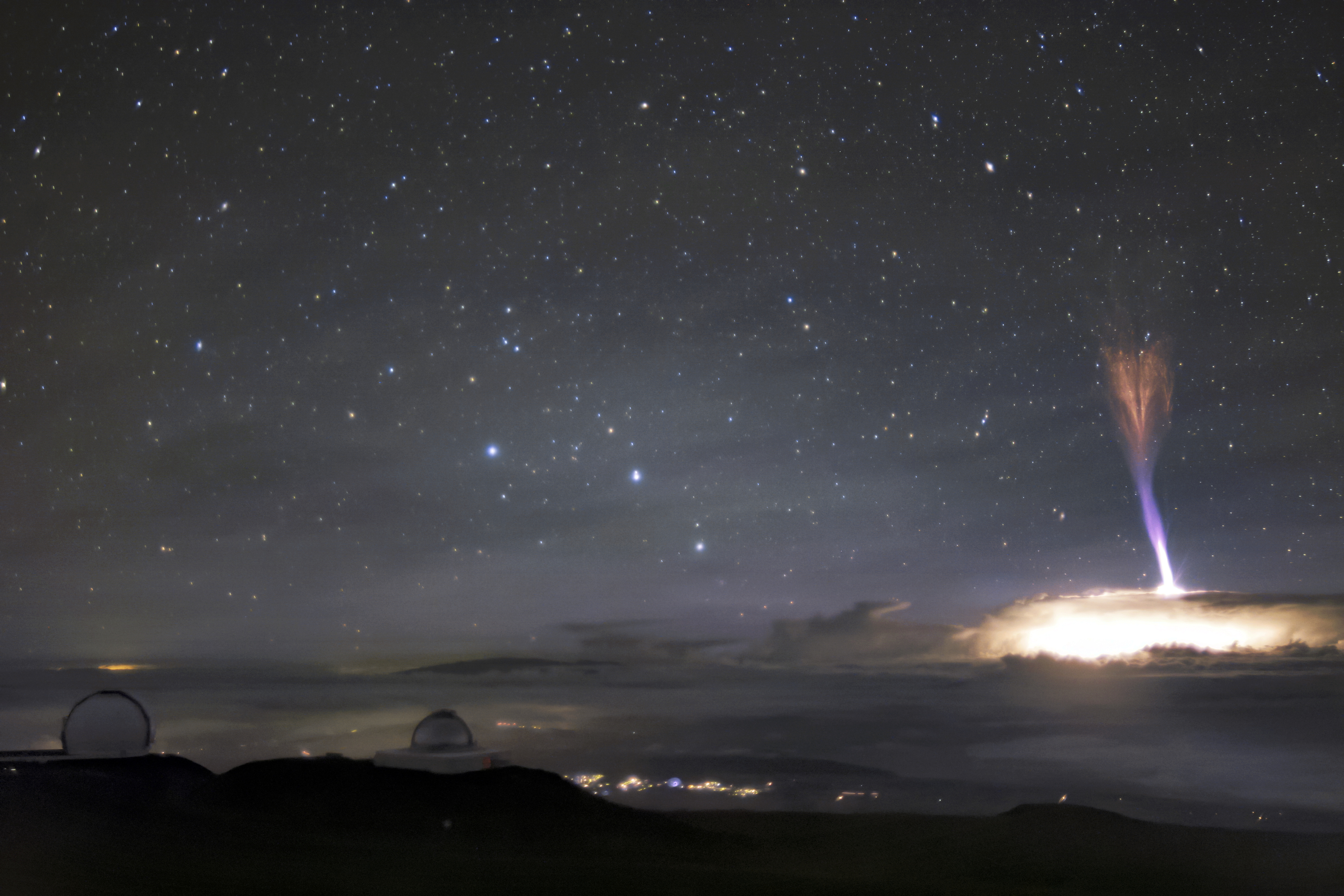
A gigantic jet photographed from the Gemini Observatory on Mauna Kea on July 24, 2017

On September 14, 2001, scientists at the Arecibo Observatory photographed a gigantic jet—double the height of those previously observed—reaching around 70 km (45 mi) into the atmosphere. The jet was located above a thunderstorm over an ocean, and lasted less than a second. The jet was initially observed to be traveling up at around 50 km/s (110,000 mph; 180,000 km/h) at a speed similar to typical lightning, increased to 160 and 270 km/s (360,000–600,000 mph; 580,000–970,000 km/h), but then split in two and sped upward with speeds of at least 2,000 km/s (4,500,000 mph; 7,200,000 km/h) to the ionosphere where it then spread out in a bright burst of light.

On July 22, 2002, five gigantic jets between 60 and 70 kilometres (35 and 45 mi) in length were observed over the South China Sea from Taiwan, reported in Nature. The jets lasted under a second, with shapes likened by the researchers to giant trees and carrots.

On the night of February 22–23, 2006, the Brazilian Southern Space Observatory, located near Rio Grande do Sul, Brazil, recorded over 400 middle-atmospheric optical discharges consisting of jets, sprites, and elves. The observatory was operating as part of the Southern Brazil Sprite Campaign, the first detailed study of transient luminous events (TLEs) over Southern Brazil. The storm was too large for the cameras to capture all of its activity, but there were more than 400 confirmed TLEs imaged, making this storm the third most active producer of TLEs ever documented. This region of central and southern South America has significantly higher-than-average lightning activity, and is known to produce some of the most active lightning storms in the world.

On November 10, 2012, the Chinese Science Bulletin reported a gigantic jet event observed over a thunderstorm in mainland China on August 12, 2010. "GJ event that was clearly recorded in eastern China (storm center located at 35.6°N,119.8°E, near the Huanghai Sea)".

On August 13, 2016, photographer Phebe Pan caught a clear wide-angle photo of a gigantic jet on a wide-angle lens while shooting Perseid meteors atop Shi Keng Kong peak in Guangdong province and Li Hualong captured the same jet from a more distant location in Jiahe, Hunan, China.

On March 28, 2017, photographer Jeff Miles captured four gigantic jets over Australia.

On July 24, 2017, the Gemini Cloudcam at the Mauna Kea Observatory in Hawaii captured several gigantic jets as well as ionosphere-height gravity waves during one thunderstorm.

On October 16, 2019, pilot Chris Holmes captured a high-resolution video of a gigantic jet from 11 km (35,000 ft) above the Gulf of Mexico near the Yucatán Peninsula. From 56 km (35 mi), Holmes's video shows a blue streamer reach up from the top of a thunderstorm to the ionosphere, becoming red at the top. Only then does a brilliant white lightning leader crawl slowly from the top of the cloud, reaching about 10% of the height of the gigantic jet before fading.

On September 20, 2021, at 10:41 pm (02:41 UTC) facing NE from Cabo Rojo, Puerto Rico, photographer Frankie Lucena recorded a video of a gigantic jet plasma event which occurred over a thunderstorm in the area.

On February 15, 2024, photographer JJ Rao captured a gigantic jet in high-resolution slow-motion video from Derby, in the Kimberley Region of Western Australia.

On July 3, 2025, astronaut Nichole Ayers aboard the International Space Station photographed a gigantic jet near the Texas-Mexico border (photo above).

== Other types ==
=== Elves ===
Photograph of an ELVES, taken from Possagno, TV, Italy, on March 27, 2023, at 21:43 UTC. The lightning that triggered it was in Polverigi, AN, Italy, at a distance of 285 km (177 mi). Its strength, estimated at 410 kilo-Ampères, which is an order of magnitude stronger than a normal lightning (10 to 30 kilo-Ampère), generated an intense electromagnetic pulse. The red ring marks where the pulse hit the Earth's ionosphere. The duration was about 1 millisecond. The "donut" has a diameter of approximately 360 km (220 mi) measured from the photo and a height above the ground of about 90–100 km (56–62 mi). The distance for this type of photo must be between 100 and 600 km (62 and 373 mi).

ELVES often appear as a dim, flattened, expanding glow around 400 km (250 mi) in diameter. They typically last for one millisecond. They occur in the ionosphere 100 km (62 mi) above the ground over thunderstorms. Their color was unknown for some time, but is now known to be red. ELVES were first recorded on a shuttle mission, recorded off French Guiana on October 7, 1990. The ELVES was discovered in a video taken on the shuttle by the Mesoscale Lightning Experiment (MLE) team at Marshall Space Flight Center, led by the Principal Investigator, Otha H."Skeet" Vaughan Jr.

ELVES is a whimsical acronym for "emissions of light and very low frequency perturbations due to electromagnetic pulse sources." This refers to the process by which the light is generated; the excitation of nitrogen molecules due to electron collisions (the electrons possibly having been energized by the electromagnetic pulse caused by a discharge from an underlying thunderstorm).

=== Trolls ===
TROLLs (transient red optical luminous lineaments) occur after strong sprites, and appear as red spots with faint tails, and on higher-speed cameras, appear as a rapid series of events, starting as a red glow that forms after a sprite tendril, that later produces a red streak downward from itself. They are similar to jets.

=== Pixies ===
Pixies were first observed during the STEPS program during the summer of 2000, a multi-organizational field program investigating the electrical characteristics over thunderstorms on the High Plains. A series of unusual, white luminous events atop the thunderstorm were observed over a 20-minute period, lasting for an average of 16 milliseconds each. They were later dubbed 'pixies'. These pixies are less than 100 meters across, and are not related to lightning.

=== Ghosts ===
Ghosts (greenish optical emission from sprite tops) are faint, green glows that appear within the footprint of a red sprite, persisting after the red has dissipated and re-igniting with the onset of subsequent sprite events. Though possible examples of ghosts can be seen in historical images, ghosts were first noted as an exclusive phenomenon by storm chasers Hank Schyma and Paul M Smith in 2019.

The first spectroscopy study to analyze the dynamics and chemistry of ghosts was led by the Atmospheric Electricity group of the Institute of Astrophysics of Andalusia (IAA). This experimental campaign reported the main contributors to the greenish hue of a single event recorded in 2019 to be atomic iron and nickel, molecular nitrogen and ionic molecular oxygen. A weak -but certain- contribution of atomic oxygen, and atomic sodium and ionic silicon were also detected.

=== Gnomes ===
Gnomes are small, brief spikes of light that point upward from a thunderstorm cloud's anvil top, caused as strong updrafts push moist air above the anvil. They last for only a few microseconds. They are about 200 meters wide, and are a maximum of 1 kilometer in height. Their color is unknown as they have only been observed in black-and-white footage. Most sources unofficially refer to them as "Gnomes".

== See also ==
- Aurora
- Heat lightning
- Schumann resonances
- St. Elmo's fire
- STEVE
