= Kifuka =

Village in Democratic Republic of the Congo

- Village
- Location within Democratic Republic of the Congo
- Coordinates: 2°46′0″S 27°44′0″E
- Elevation: 970 m (3,180 ft)
- Time zone: GMT+2

Kifuka is a village in South Kivu, Democratic Republic of the Congo (DRC). The village, located at 970 metres (3,180 ft) altitude in a mountainous region, is the nearest populated place to the site which receives the second most annual lightning strikes of any place worldwide, being struck by 158 lightning bolts per square kilometer each year (409 per sq mi).

== Lightning ==
Kifuka's high density of lightning is a result of warm Atlantic air traveling over the Congo rainforest before colliding with cool mountain air. These masses generate static charges, resulting in lightning. Although the DRC is subject to seasonal monsoons, the lightning occurs in high density year-round, with added intensity from October to March and decreased activity from June to August. Outside of Kifuka, the Albertine Rift, particularly the Virunga Mountains, are also a source of high-density lightning strikes nearby and thunderstorm development.

While Kifuka was once considered the most active area for lightning on earth, Guinness World Records has since dubbed the Catatumbo lightning phenomenon as producing more bolts per square kilometer.
