= Lightning records =

List of world records related to lightning

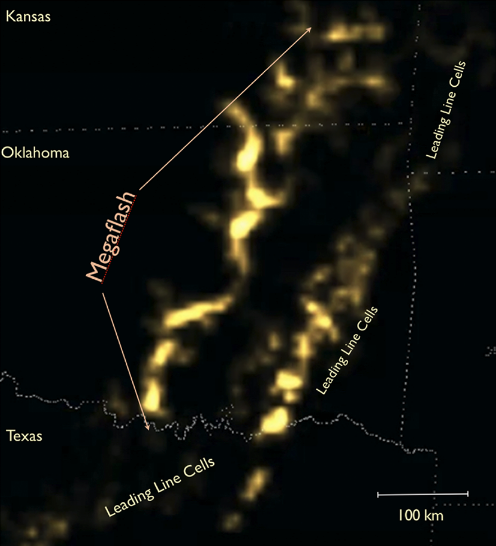
The longest known lightning bolt, spanning approximately 829 kilometers from Texas to Missouri. The image shows the bolt's optical radiance over 7.18 seconds on the night of October 22, 2017.

Because technology to measure lightning is advancing rapidly, records of extreme lightning are an emerging area. Large lightning discharges remain difficult for scientists to measure and observe.

The longest horizontal distance spanned by a known lightning bolt is 829 kilometers, or 515 miles, over the US states of Mississippi, Louisiana and Texas in 2020. The longest known duration of a bolt is more than 17 seconds, observed over Uruguay and northern Argentina in 2020. As the technology to measure these so-called megaflashes is emerging, scientists anticipate more length records in the future.

The highest energy lightning bolts are called superbolts; the maximum energy of superbolts is difficult to determine directly. Optical output up to approximately 10 terawatts has been recorded by satellites. Attempts have been made to estimate and compare bolt energy in joules, by the heat produced, and by the length of resulting fulgurites. The highest known electrical potential for an entire thunderstorm is 1.3 giga volts.

== Longest ==
The longest lightning bolts are called megaflashes, defined as a lightning flash with a horizontal path length of approximately 100 km or greater, typically more than 5 seconds in duration. Megaflashes occur in mesoscale convective systems. Because megaflashes are typically reported when they are record-breaking, each megaflash in the tables below was either the longest-distance or longest-duration known flash of lightning at the time it was reported.

=== Longest distance megaflashes ===
Length	Date	Location	Notes
829 ± 8 km	October 22, 2017	Eastern Texas to near Kansas City, Missouri	Recorded by GOES-16; certified in 2025 by World Meteorological Organization as the world's lengthiest known lightning flash
768 ± 8 km	April, 29 2020	Mississippi, Louisiana and Texas	Reported as a world record in 2022
709 ± 8 km	October 31, 2018	Southern Brazil	Record length until 2022, when a 2020 bolt was discovered to be longer.

=== Longest duration megaflashes ===
Duration	Date	Location	Notes
17.102 ± 0.002 seconds	June 18, 2020	Uruguay and northern Argentina	World's longest duration lightning flash known as of 2022
16.73 seconds	March 4, 2019	Northern Argentina	

=== Megaflash images ===
Animation of megaflash data on 22 October 2017

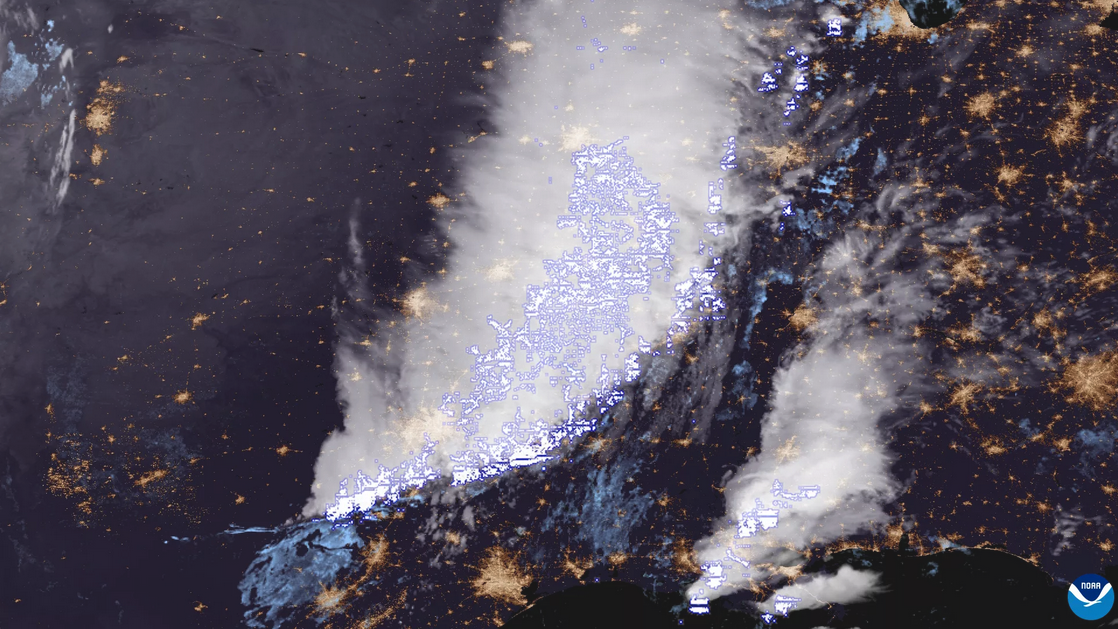
GOES-16 satellite data of October 22, 2017 megaflash

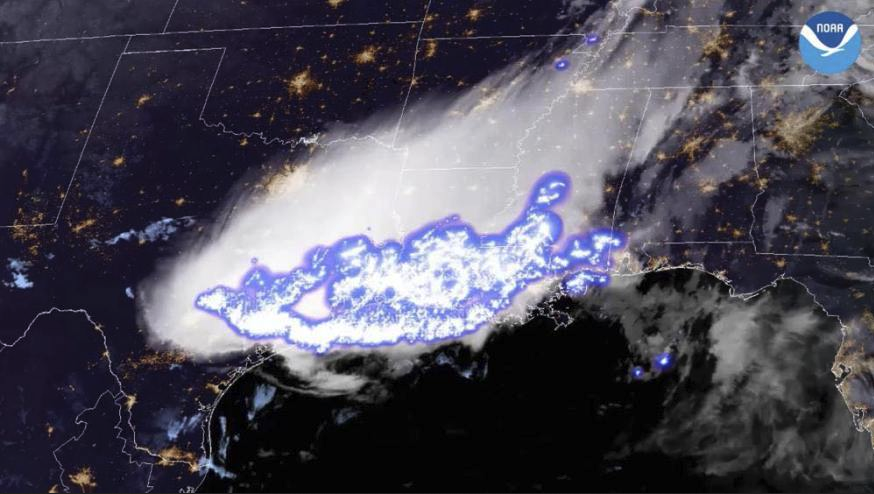
Satellite data including April 29, 2020 megaflash

== Highest energy ==
Measuring the amount of energy in lightning discharge is difficult. Lightning bolt energy can be approximated by measuring electrical current or temperature. Optical output (in gigawatts) has been measured since the 1970s, but is not sufficient to determine the energy of the bolt. Some instruments measure lightning discharge signals that cannot easily be organized into individual lightning flashes. Because of the lack of a standard unit of measure for lightning and the diversity of instruments, intercomparisons are difficult. Attempts to quantify the maximum energy of lightning are estimates.

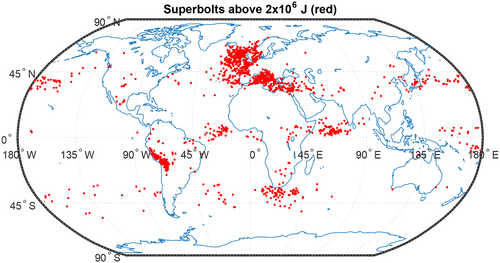
Global distribution of the largest superbolts

Earth's most powerful lightning bolts are known as superbolts. They occur primarily over the oceans and seas, unlike normal lighting which occurs primarily over land. First observed in the 1970s with the Vela satellites, bolts greater than 10 gigawatts of optical power per stroke qualify as superbolts. The highest optical power observed at that time was on the order of 10^{13} watts, or 10 terawatts. Because of their power, scientists also believe superbolts produce much hotter temperatures than normal strokes of lightning. The energy of these bolts has been estimated at more than 1 million joules.

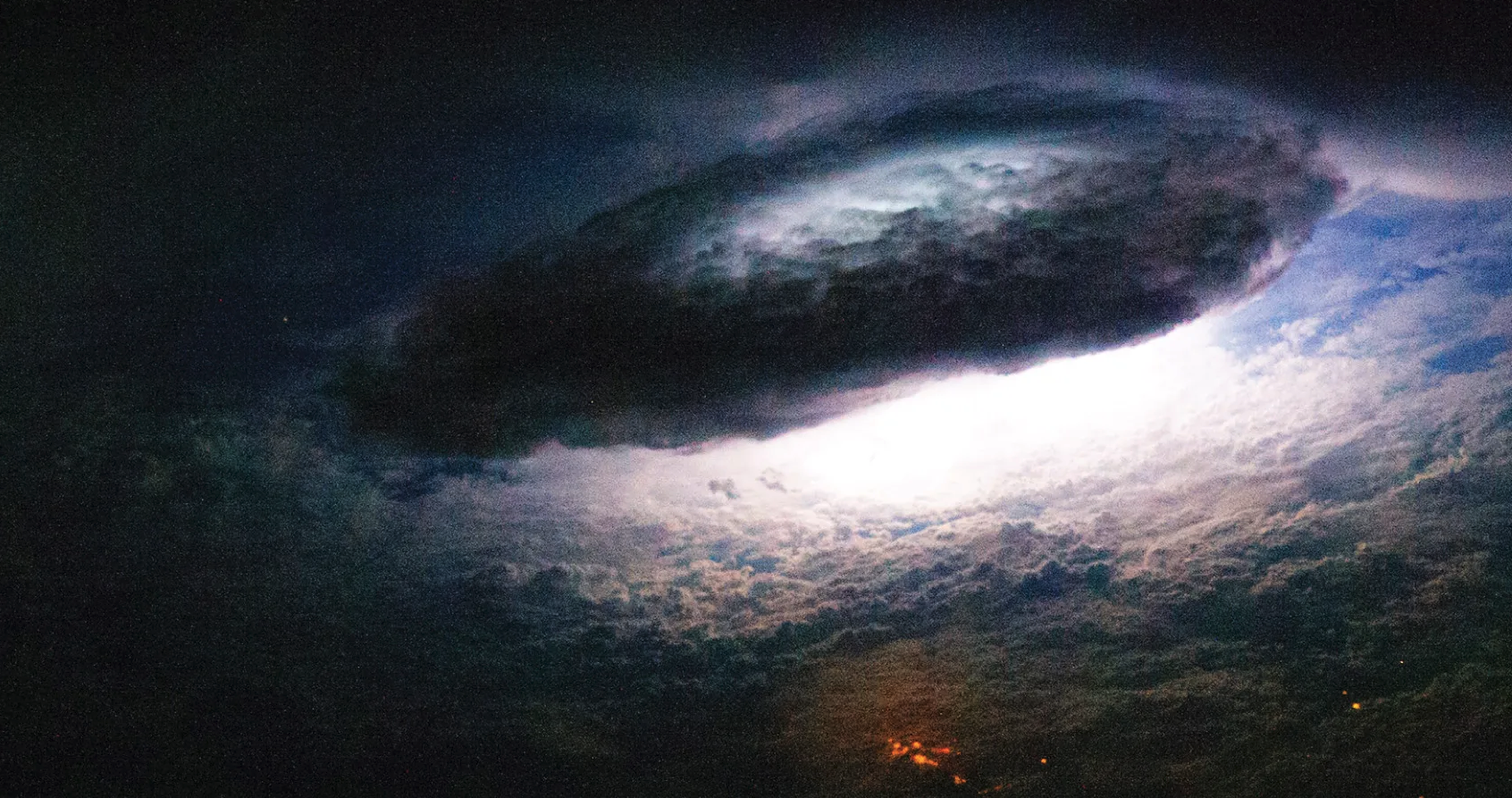
Lightning reflected by a lower layer of clouds while hidden by an upper layer, complicating the measurement of intensity

Observation of lightning's optical power is complicated by clouds, which can both reflect (amplify) and hide (reduce) the observed intensity of light, resulting in uncertainty about which apparent superbolts are truly high-energy and which are simply the result of reflected light. Superbolt discharges are so strong that they cannot be reproduced in the laboratory. It is unknown why they happen more often over water, and in the winter.

When lightning strikes sand or clay, it creates a hollow cylinder of glass called a fulgurite. The size of the fulgurite can be used to approximate the energy of the bolt, creating a "fossilized" record of lightning energy even from the distant past. The longest confirmed fulgurite discovered measures 5 meters.

The highest voltage thunderstorm recorded on Earth occurred on December 1, 2015 in India. Using a muon telescope researchers measured the storm at 1.3 billion volts. This measures the entire electric field generated by the storm, accounting for the total electrical potential between the highest and lowest portions of a thundercloud, rather than a single bolt. The Indian storm was 10 times larger than previous storms measured by this method.

Measurements from the New Horizons space probe indicate that thunderstorms on Jupiter are 10 times more powerful than any ever recorded on Earth, according to NASA.

== Deadliest ==
The World Meteorological Organization reports these as the deadliest confirmed lightning strikes as of 2022: The most people killed directly by a single flash of lightning were 21 people huddled for safety in a hut in Zimbabwe in 1975. The most killed indirectly were 469 people killed in 1994 in Dronka, Egypt when lightning struck a set of oil tanks, causing a flood of burning oil.

Lightning disproportionately kills people in developing countries. In Zimbabwe lightning kills around 20 per 1 million people, which is about 100 times higher than the lightning death rate in Europe. In Malawi it kills 84 people per million. Because housing and indoor employment in the developed world protect people from lightning, it almost exclusively kills people involved in outdoor sports and leisure. The most lightning deaths occur while fishing.

Older claims of death by lightning are difficult to verify. The 1769 Brescia explosion, caused by a lightning strike on a store of gunpowder, resulted in reports ranging from 400 to several thousand killed.
