= Condition monitoring of transformers =

Condition monitoring of transformers in electrical engineering is the process of acquiring and processing data related to various parameters of transformers to determine their state of quality and predict their failure. This is done by observing the deviation of the transformer parameters from their expected values. Transformers are the most critical assets of electrical transmission and distribution systems, and their failures could cause power outages, personal and environmental hazards, and expensive rerouting or purchase of power from other suppliers. Identifying a transformer which is near failure can allow it to be replaced under controlled conditions at a non-critical time and avoid a system failure.

Transformer failures can occur due to various causes. Transformer in-service interruptions and failures usually result from dielectric breakdown, winding distortion caused by short circuits, hots spots caused by localized deviations in winding and electromagnetic fields, deterioration of insulation, effects of lightning and other electrical disturbances, inadequate maintenance, loose connections, overloading, or failure of accessory components (e.g.: OLTCs, bushings, etc). Accounting for these causes through monitoring can allow for the determination of the overall condition of the transformer.

== Aspects ==
The important aspects of condition monitoring of transformers are:

Thermal modelling – The useful life of a transformer is partially determined by the ability of the transformer to dissipate its internally generated heat to its surroundings. The comparison of actual and predicted operating temperatures can provide a sensitive diagnosis of the transformer condition and might indicate abnormal operation. Consequences of temperature rise include gradual deterioration of insulation, damage which is very costly. To predict this, thermal modelling is used to determine the top transformer oil temperature and hot spot temperature (the maximum temperature occurring in the winding insulation system) rise.

Dissolved gas analysis – The degradation of transformer oil and solid insulating materials produces gases, which are generated at a more rapid rate when an electrical fault occurs. By evaluating the concentration and proportion of hydrocarbon gasses, hydrogen, and carbon oxides present in the transformer, it is possible to predict early stage faults in three categories: corona or partial discharge, thermal heating, and arcing.

Frequency response analysis – When a transformer is subjected to high currents through fault currents (abnormal currents), the mechanical structure and windings are subjected to severe mechanical stresses causing winding movement and deformations. It may also result in insulation damage and turn-to-turn faults. Frequency response analysis (FRA) is a non-intrusive and sensitive technique for detecting winding movement faults and assessing the deformation caused by loss of clamping pressure or by short-circuit forces. FRA technique involves measuring the impedance of the windings of the transformer with a low-voltage sine input varying in a wide frequency range.

Partial discharge (PD) analysis – Partial discharge occurs when a local electric field exceeds a threshold value, partially breaking the surrounding medium. Its cumulative effect leads to the degradation of insulation. PDs are initiated by defects during manufacture or higher stress dictated by design considerations. Measurements can be collected to detect these PDs and monitor the soundness of insulation. PDs manifest as sharp current pulses at transformer terminals, whose nature depends on the types of insulation, defects, measuring circuits, and detectors used.
