= Corona ring =

Device for prevention of corona discharge on high-voltage equipment

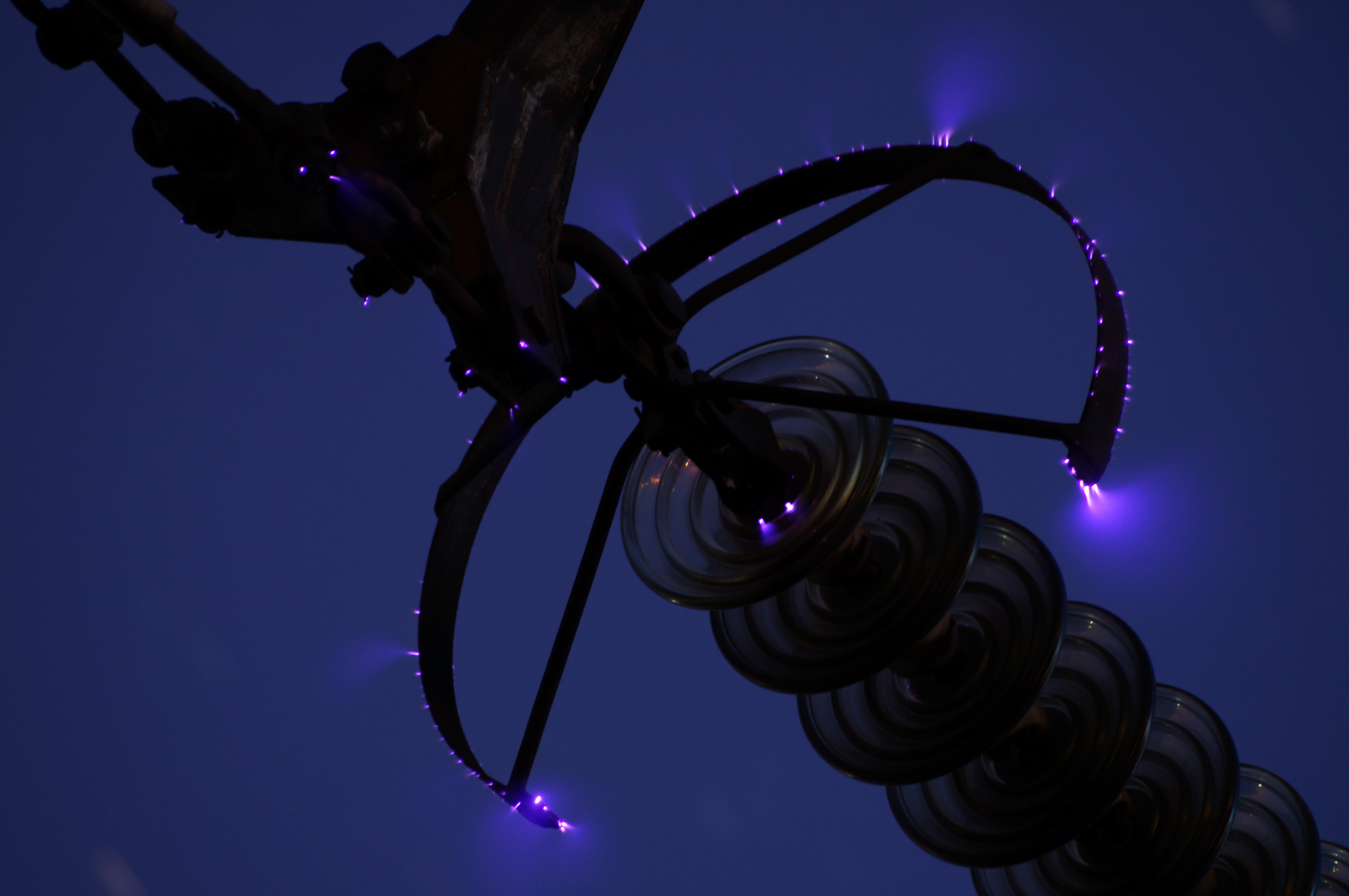
Corona discharge on insulator string of a 500 kV transmission line

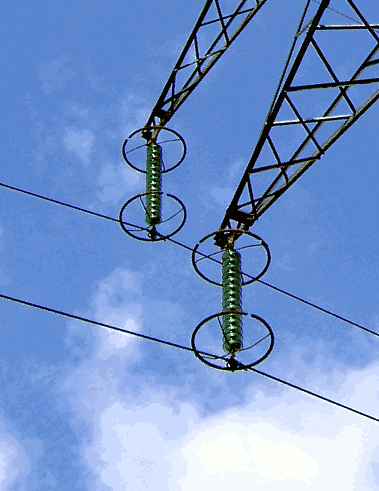
Corona rings on insulator strings on a 225 kV transmission line in France

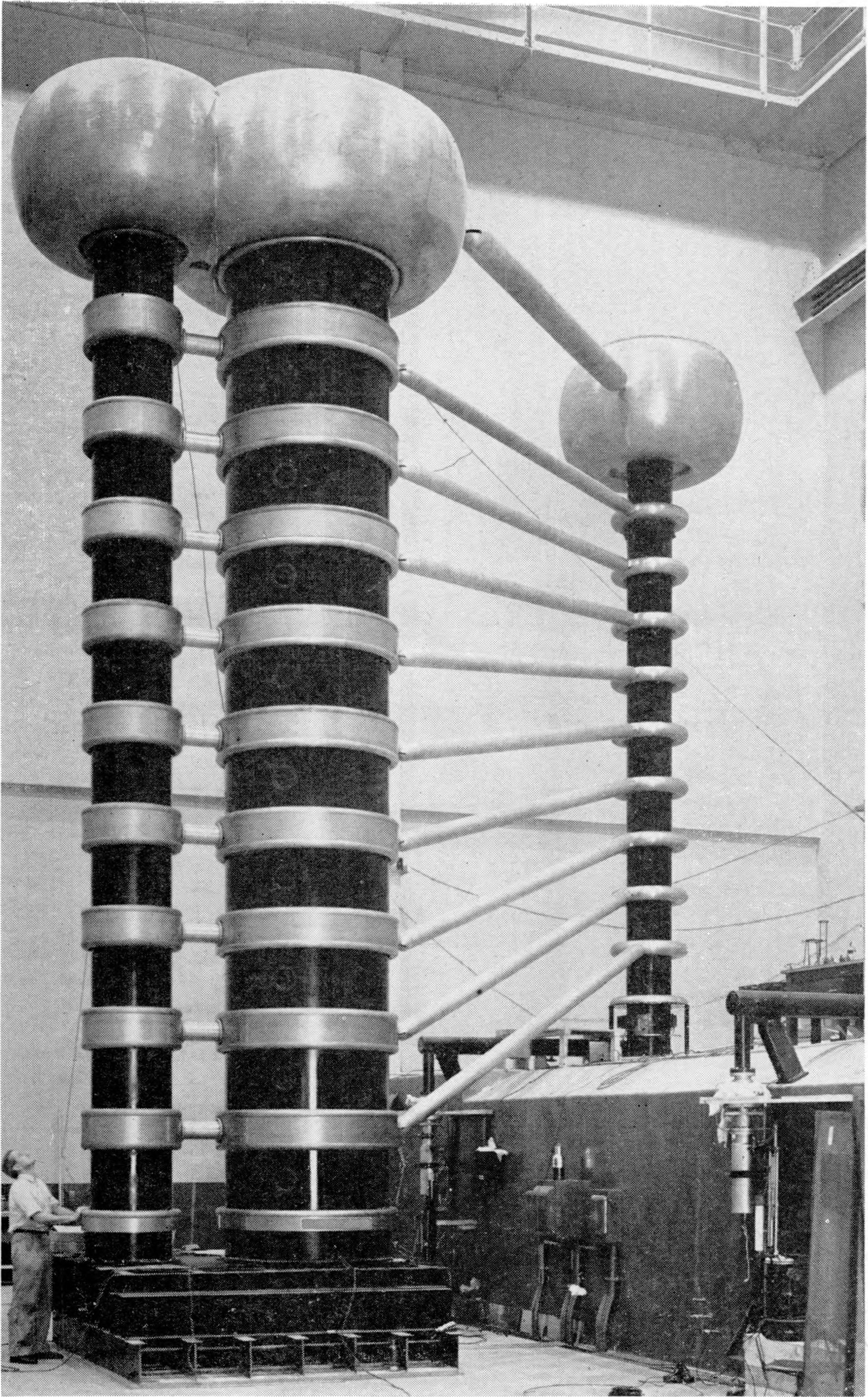
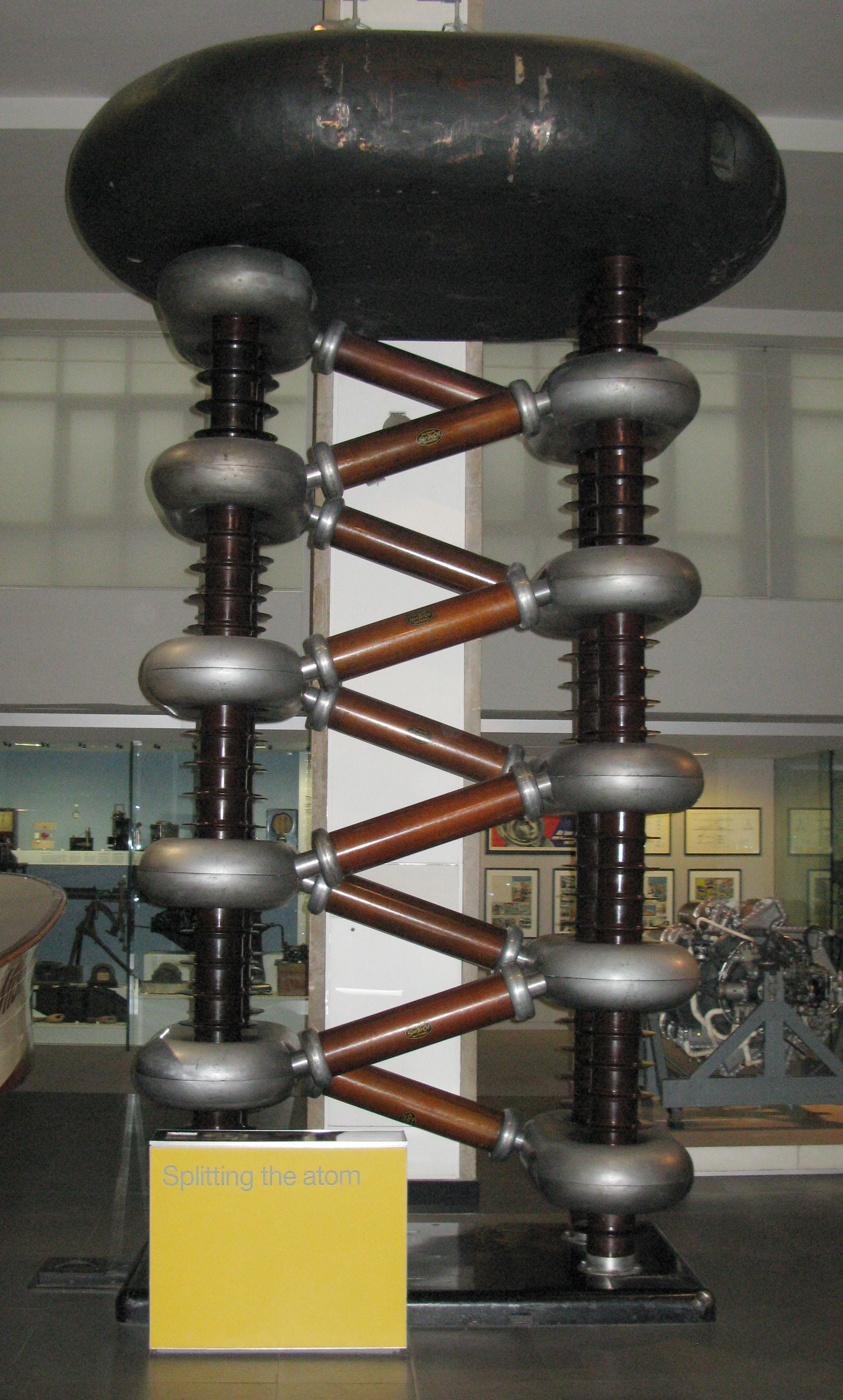
(left) Grading rings on 1.4 MV X-ray generator at the US Bureau of Standards in 1947. (right) Corona caps and rings on the Cockcroft–Walton particle accelerator from 1937, now in the Science Museum, London.

In electrical engineering, a corona ring, more correctly referred to as an anti-corona ring, is a toroid of conductive material, usually metal, which is attached to a terminal or other irregular hardware piece of high voltage equipment. The purpose of the corona ring is to distribute the electric field and lower its maximum values below the corona threshold, preventing corona discharge. Corona rings are used on very high voltage power transmission insulators and switchgear, and on scientific research apparatus that generates high voltages. A very similar related device, the grading ring, is used around insulators.

== Corona discharge ==
Corona discharge is a leakage of electric current into the air adjacent to high voltage conductors. It is sometimes visible as a dim blue glow in the air next to sharp points on high voltage equipment. The high electric field ionizes the air, making the air conductive; this allows current to leak from the conductor into the air in the form of ions. In very high voltage electric power transmission lines and equipment, corona is an economically significant waste of power and may cause the hardware to deteriorate. In devices such as electrostatic generators, Marx generators, and tube-type television sets, the current load caused by corona leakage can reduce the voltage produced by the device, causing it to malfunction. Coronas also produce noxious and corrosive ozone gas, which can cause aging and brittleness of nearby structures such as insulators. The gasses create a health hazard for workers and local residents. For these reasons corona discharge is considered undesirable in most electrical equipment.

== How the rings work ==
Corona discharges only occur when the electric field (potential gradient) at the surface of conductors exceeds a critical value, the dielectric strength or disruptive potential gradient of air. Its value is roughly 30 kV/cm at sea level, but decreases when atmospheric pressure decreases. (Corona discharge is therefore more likely at high altitudes.) The electric field at the surface of a conductor is greatest where the curvature is sharpest, so corona discharge occurs first at sharp points, corners and edges.

The terminals on very high voltage equipment are frequently designed with large diameter rounded shapes such as balls and toruses called corona caps, to eliminate pointed shapes and suppress corona formation. Some parts of high voltage circuits have hardware with exposed sharp edges or corners, such as the attachment points where wires or bus bars are connected to insulators; corona caps or corona rings are usually installed at these points to prevent corona formation.

A corona ring is electrically connected to the high voltage conductor and encircles the points where corona would form. Since the ring is at the same potential as the conductor, the presence of the ring reduces the potential gradient at the surface of the conductor below the disruptive potential gradient, preventing corona from forming on the points it surrounds.

== Grading rings ==
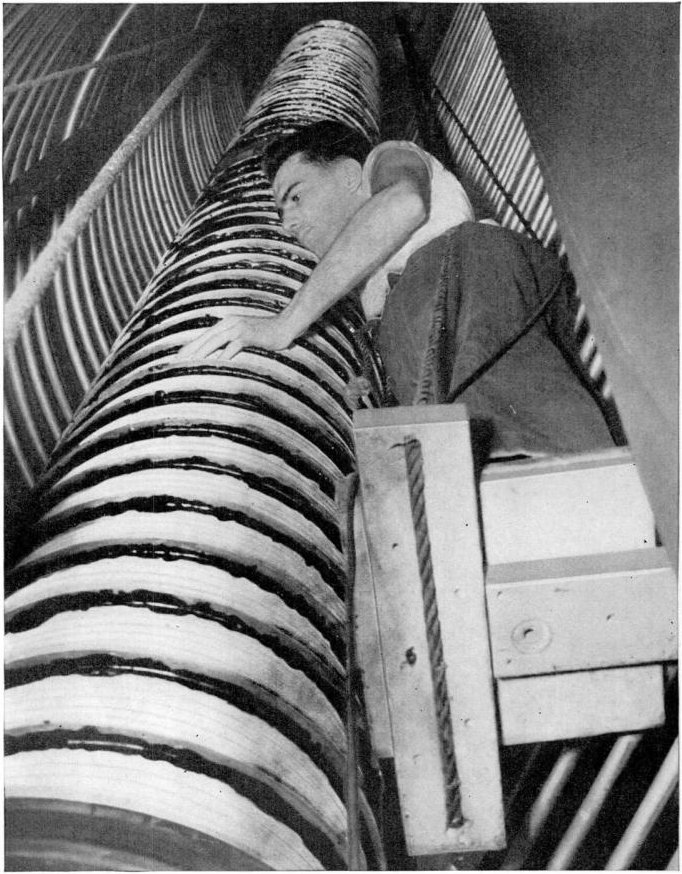
Grading rings along a linear accelerator beam tube at the University of Pennsylvania in 1940

A very similar device, called a grading ring, is also used on high-voltage equipment. Grading ring works in a same way that corona ring does but their main difference lies in how and where they are used. Corona rings are used around conductors while grading rings are used on insulators where its purpose is to reduce potential gradient along the insulator, to prevent the electrical breakdown.

Across an insulating column, the electric field intensity is not uniform — it is greatest near the high potential end. If the applied voltage exceeds the air or the insulator surface's breakdown voltage, breakdown begins at that end, where the field is strongest. As soon as the insulator's surface at that end becomes conductive, the full system voltage is applied across the remaining length of the insulator, creating a higher electric field, so the failure propagates rapidly toward the grounded side, producing a flashover arc. Limiting the electric field at the high voltage end therefore lets the same insulator tolerate a much higher operating voltage.

The grading ring is mounted around the high voltage end of the insulator, connected to the high voltage terminal. Its smooth electric field equipotential lines reduce the potential gradient and thus the electric field along that part of the insulator where it is highest. The result is a shorter or lower‑cost insulator that can handle the same kV rating, and the usual erosion, corona cutting, and surface tracking at the energized end are dramatically reduced.

For insulating columns working at extreme potentials—Marx generators or particle accelerator drift tubes, multiple grading rings are installed, usually at equal intervals along the insulator, each connected to a series chain of megohm resistors that acts as a built‑in voltage divider. Therefore, the potential across each section of the insulator between adjacent rings is equalized, so that the entire length of the insulator is subjected to a uniform electric field, and no section has to withstand an excessive field. This equalization strategy minimizes the chance of premature puncture, maximizing system reliability while keeping component size and cost in check.

== Uses ==
Corona rings are used on extremely high voltage apparatus like Van de Graaff generators, Cockcroft–Walton generators, and particle accelerators, as well as electric power transmission insulators, bushings, and switchgear. Manufacturers suggest a corona ring on the line end of the insulator for transmission lines above 230 kV and on both ends for potentials above 500 kV. Corona rings prolong the lifetime of insulator surfaces by suppressing the effects of corona discharge.

Corona rings may also be installed on the insulators of antennas of high-power radio transmitters. However, they increase the capacitance of the insulators.

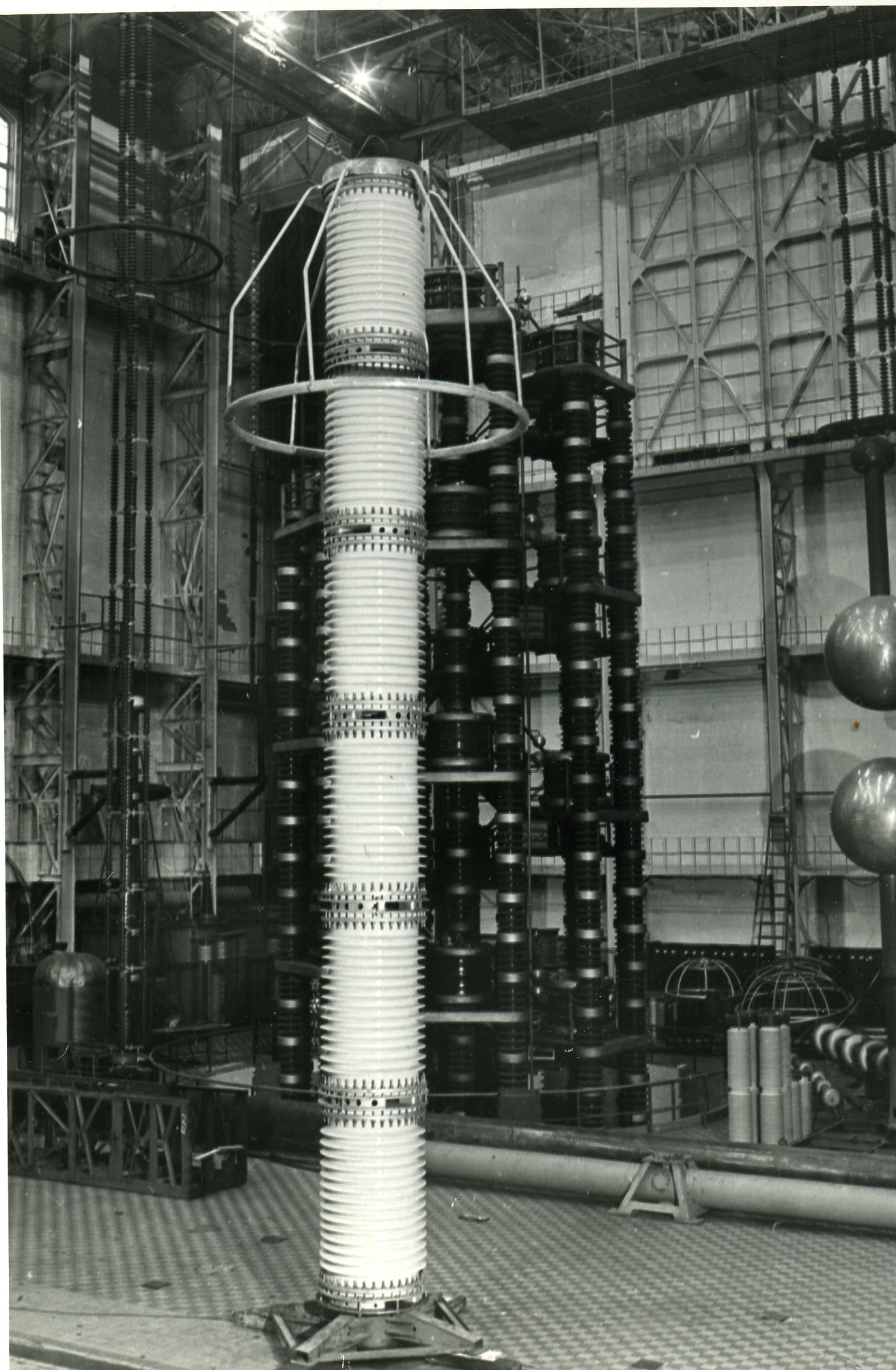
Grading ring on a Russian surge arrester

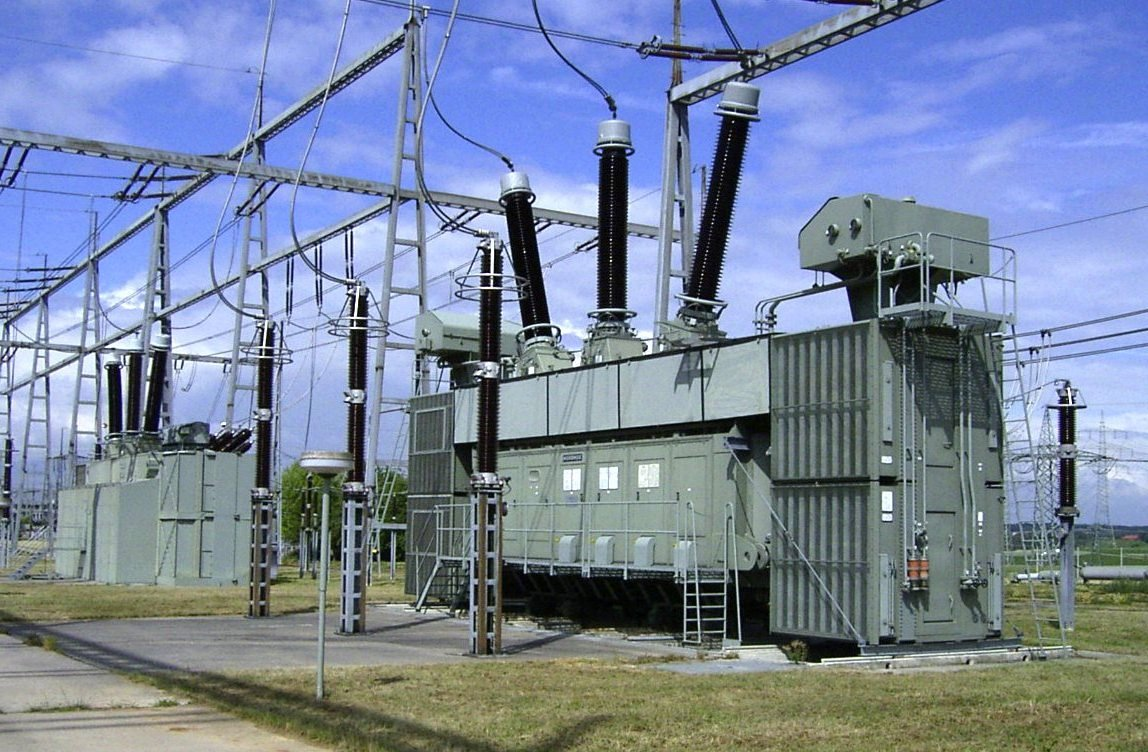
Grading rings on transformer bushings

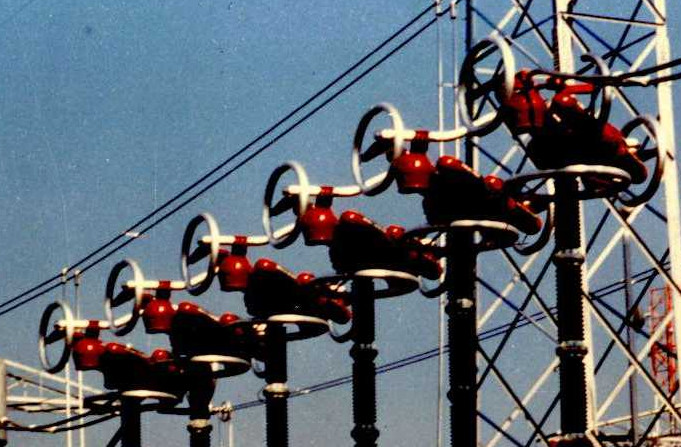
Corona rings on switch gear

== See also ==
- Arcing horns
