= HSSE =

HSSE may refer to:

- Headspace sorptive extraction, an examination method of electrical transformer oil which breaks down over time
- HSSE tool steel, a type of high-speed steel (HSS) with cobalt-alloy used as a cutting tool material, see High-speed steel#Cobalt High Speed Steels (HSS)
- Health, safety, security and the environment, a term used in the petroleum industry or as a department of bigger firms, for the general issue see Environment, health and safety
