= Brush discharge =

Ionization of air characterized as writhing streamers and sparks

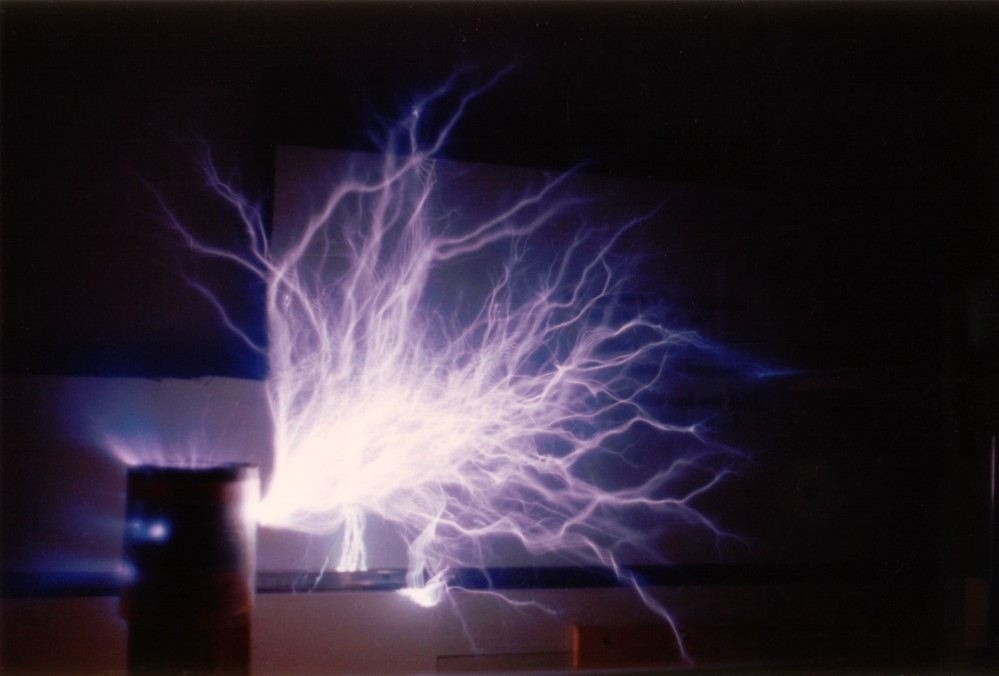
A large brush discharge from the top of a Tesla coil.

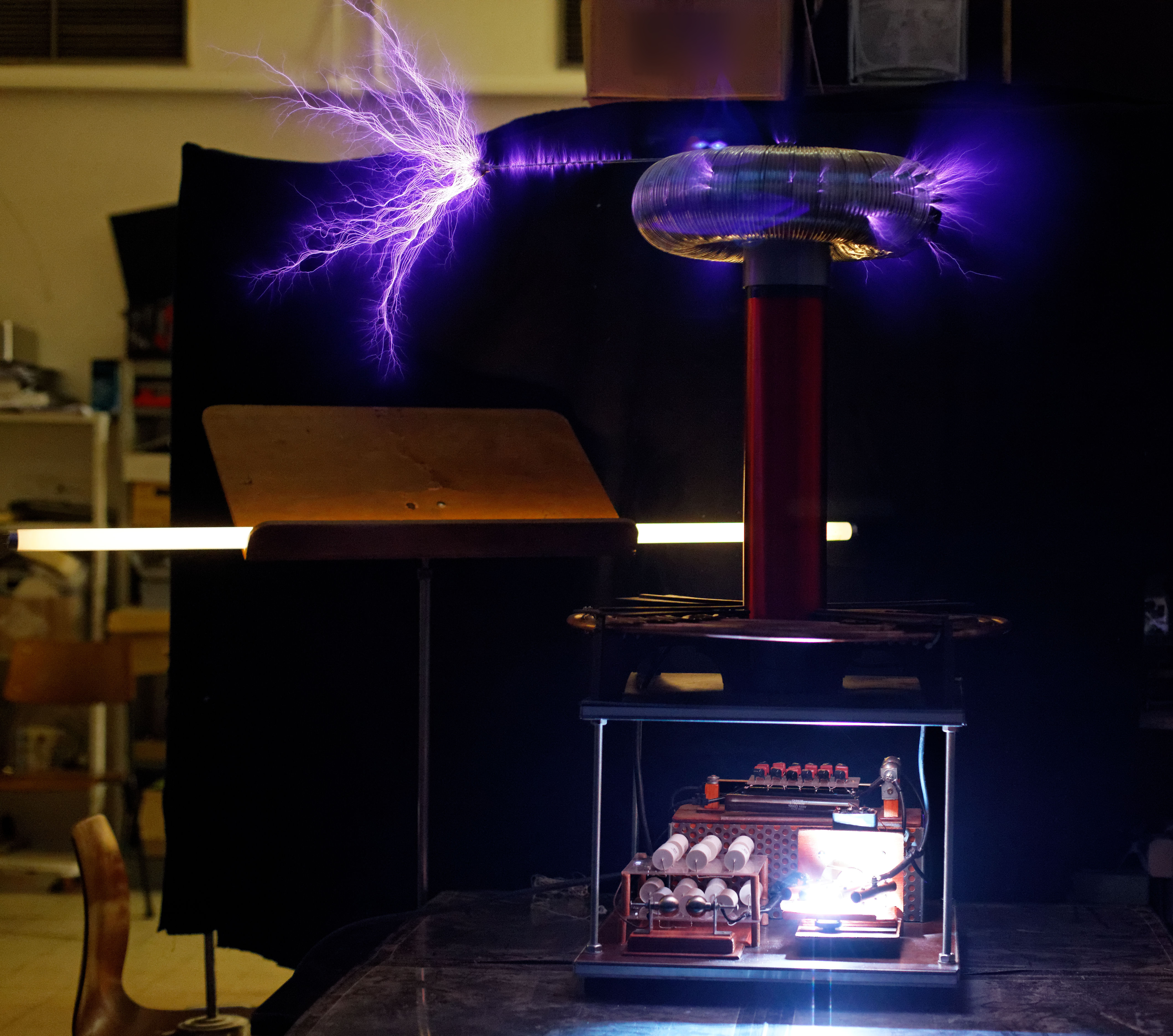
Comparison of brush discharge (left) and corona discharges (right) from a Tesla coil

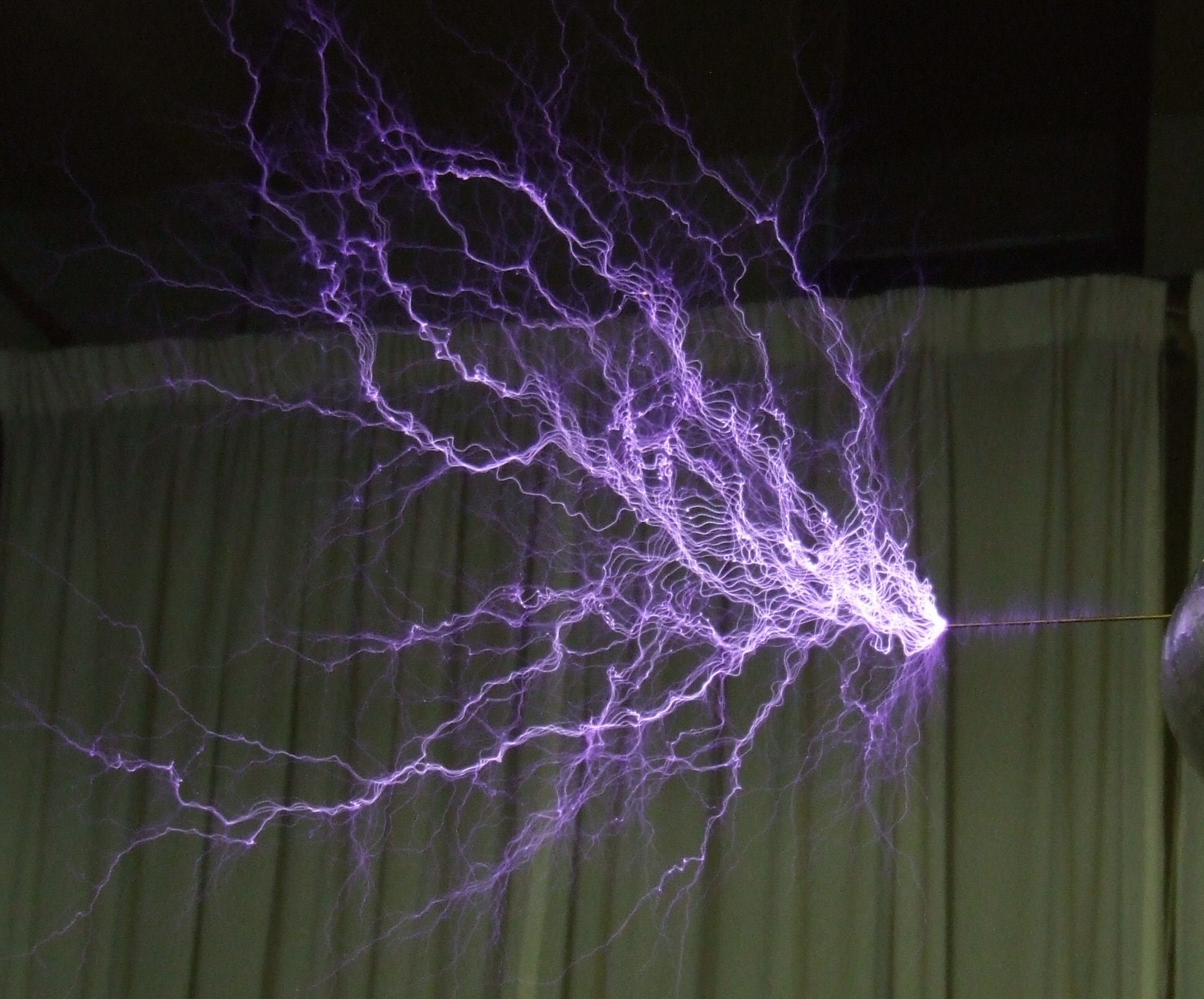
Closeup of a Tesla coil brush discharge, showing its filamentous nature

A brush discharge is an electrical disruptive discharge similar to a corona discharge that takes place at an electrode with a high voltage applied to it, embedded in a nonconducting fluid, usually air. It is characterized by numerous luminous writhing sparks, plasma streamers composed of ionized air molecules, which repeatedly strike out from the electrode into the air, often with a crackling sound. The streamers spread out in a fan shape, giving it the appearance of a "brush".

Corona and brush discharges are sometimes called one-electrode discharges because they occur in the vicinity of a single electrode, and don't extend as far as the electrode carrying opposite polarity voltage in the circuit, as an electric arc (a two-electrode discharge) does.

- Corona discharge — occurs at sharp points and edges (radius < 1 mm). It is a uniform ionization (glow discharge) visible as a dim stationary blue glow, fading out as it extends from the conductor.
- Brush discharge — occurs at a curved electrode (radius between 5 and 50 mm) in the vicinity of a flat electrode. It consists of a short ionization channel which breaks up into a fan of multiple moving streamers which strike toward the other electrode. If the electrode is too sharp, a corona discharge will usually occur instead of a brush discharge.
- Arc or spark discharge — A "two electrode" discharge that occurs when an ionized channel extends all the way from one electrode to the other. This allows a large current to flow, releasing a large amount of energy.

Both brush and corona discharges represent local regions next to conductors where due to the high voltage the air has undergone electrical breakdown: it has ionized and become conductive, allowing current to leak into the air. They occur when the electric field at the conductor exceeds the dielectric strength of the air, the "disruptive potential gradient", roughly 30 kilovolts per centimeter. At that voltage, electrons in the air are accelerated by the electric field to a high enough velocity that they knock other electrons off gas molecules when they hit them, creating ions and additional electrons, which go on to ionize additional molecules in a chain reaction. The electric field is highest at sharp points on the conductor, so discharges tend to form at these points. Because the electric field decreases as the distance from the conductor increases, it eventually drops below the value needed for ionization, so corona and brush discharges have a limited extent and are localized near the conductor.

Occurring in very high voltage equipment like EHV power transmission lines, radio transmitters and their antennas, CRT power supplies, and power supplies for scientific equipment like lasers and particle accelerators, a brush discharge represents a serious failure of electrical insulation, and may be a fire hazard. Like other electric arcs, brush discharges produce ozone gas, which can be noxious to nearby people in an enclosed space and over time can cause embrittlement of some plastics. Tesla coils producing brush discharges and streamer discharges are displayed for entertainment at science fairs and rock concerts.

The ability of an electrical discharge to cause an explosion in flammable atmospheres is measured by the effective energy of the discharge. The effective energy of brush discharges is 10-20 mJ, much larger than that of corona discharges 0.1 mJ. Therefore, brush discharges are considered an explosion hazard, while corona discharges are not. Brush discharges can occur from charged insulating plastics (for example polyethylene) to a conductor.

== See also ==
- Lichtenberg figure
- Partial discharge
- Glow discharge
- Electrostatic discharge
- Electric spark
