= Partial discharge =

Localized dielectric breakdown under high voltage stress

In electrical engineering, partial discharge (PD) is a localized dielectric breakdown (DB) (which does not completely bridge the space between the two conductors) of a small portion of a solid or fluid electrical insulation (EI) system under high voltage (HV) stress. While a corona discharge (CD) is usually revealed by a relatively steady glow or brush discharge (BD) in air, partial discharges within solid insulation system are not visible.

PD can occur in a gaseous, liquid, or solid insulating medium. It often starts within gas voids, such as voids in solid epoxy insulation or bubbles in transformer oil. Protracted partial discharge can erode solid insulation and eventually lead to breakdown of insulation.

== Discharge mechanism ==
A partial discharge within solid insulation. When a spark jumps the gap within the gas-filled void, a small current flows in the conductors, attenuated by the voltage divider network Cx, Cy, Cz in parallel with the bulk capacitance Cb

PD usually begins within voids, cracks, or inclusions within a solid dielectric, at conductor-dielectric interfaces within solid or liquid dielectrics, or in bubbles within liquid dielectrics. Since PDs are limited to only a portion of the insulation, the discharges only partially bridge the distance between electrodes. PD can also occur along the boundary between different insulating materials.

Partial discharges within an insulating material are usually initiated within gas-filled voids within the dielectric. Because the dielectric constant of the void is considerably less than the surrounding dielectric, the electric field across the void is significantly higher than that across an equivalent distance of dielectric. If the voltage stress across the void is increased above the corona inception voltage (CIV) for the gas within the void, PD activity will start within the void.

PD can also occur along the surface of solid insulating materials if the surface tangential electric field is high enough to cause a breakdown along the insulator surface. This phenomenon commonly manifests itself on overhead line insulators, particularly on contaminated insulators during days of high humidity. Overhead lines use air as their insulation medium.

=== PD equivalent circuit ===
The equivalent circuit of a dielectric incorporating a cavity can be modeled as a capacitive voltage divider in parallel with another capacitor. The upper capacitor of the divider represents the parallel combination of the capacitances in series with the void and the lower capacitor represents the capacitance of the void. The parallel capacitor represents the remaining unvoided capacitance of the sample.

=== Partial discharge currents ===
Whenever partial discharge is initiated, high frequency transient current pulses will appear and persist for nanoseconds to a microsecond, then disappear and reappear repeatedly as the voltage sinewave goes through the zero crossing. The PD happens near the peak voltage both positive and negative. PD pulses are easy to measure using the high frequency current transducer (HFCT) method. The current transducer is clamped around the case ground of the component being tested. The severity of the PD is measured by measuring the burst interval between the end of a burst and the beginning of the next burst. As the insulation breakdown worsens, the burst interval will shorten due to the breakdown happening at lower voltages. This burst interval will continue to shorten until a critical 2 millisecond point is reached. At this 2 ms point, the discharge is very close to the zero crossing and will fail with a full blown discharge and major failure. The HFCT method needs to be used because of the small magnitude and short duration of these PD events. The HFCT method is done while the component being tested stays energized and loaded. It is completely non-intrusive. Another method of measuring these currents is to put a small current-measuring resistor in series with the sample and then view the generated voltage on an oscilloscope via a matched coaxial cable.

When PD, arcing or sparking occurs, electromagnetic waves propagate away from the fault site in all directions which contact the transformer tank and travel to earth (ground cable) where the HFCT is located to capture any EMI or EMP within the transformer, breaker, PT, CT, HV Cable, MCSG, LTC, LA, generator, large hv motors, etc. Detection of the high-frequency pulses will identify the existence of partial discharge, arcing or sparking. After PD or arcing is detected, the next step is to locate the fault area. Using the acoustic emission method (AE), 4 or more AE sensors are placed on the transformer shell where the AE and HFCT wavedata is collected at the same time. Bandpass filtering is used to eliminate interference from system noises.

Partial discharge degradation can be caused by various factors, including inadequate stress regulation, or the presence of voids or delamination in the ground wall insulation. These issues can eventually result in machine failure.

== Discharge detection and measuring systems ==
With the partial discharge measurement, the dielectric condition of high voltage equipment can be evaluated, and electrical treeing in the insulation can be detected and located. Partial discharge measurement can localize the damaged part of an insulated system.

Data collected during partial discharge testing is compared to measurement values of the same cable gathered during the acceptance-test or to factory quality control standards. This allows simple and quick classification of the dielectric condition (new, strongly aged, faulty) of the device under test and appropriate maintenance and repair measures may be planned and organized in advance.

Partial discharge measurement is applicable to cables and accessories with various insulation materials, such as polyethylene or paper-insulated lead-covered (PILC) cable. Partial discharge measurement is routinely carried out to assess the condition of the insulation system of rotating machines (motors and generators), transformers, and gas-insulated switchgear.

=== Partial discharge measurement system ===
A partial discharge measurement system basically consists of:

- a cable or other object being tested
- a coupling capacitor of low inductance design
- a high-voltage supply with low background noise
- high-voltage connections
- a high voltage filter to reduce background noise from the power supply
- a partial discharge detector
- PC software for analysis

A partial discharge detection system for in-service, energized electric power equipment:

- a cable, transformer, or any MV/HV power equipment
- Ultra High Frequency Sensor (UHF) Detection Bandwidth 300 MHz-1.5 GHz
- High Frequency Current Transformer (HFCT) Bandwidth 500 kHz-50 MHz
- Ultrasonic microphone with center frequency 40 kHz
- Acoustic Contact Sensor with detection bandwidth 20 kHz - 300 kHz
- TEV sensor or coupling capacitor 3 MHz-100 MHz
- Phase-resolved analysis system to compare pulse timing to AC frequency

=== The principle of partial discharge measurement ===
A number of discharge detection schemes and partial discharge measurement methods have been invented since the importance of PD was realized in the late 20th century. Partial discharge currents tend to be of short duration and have rise times in the nanosecond realm. On an oscilloscope, the discharges appear as evenly spaced burst events that occur at the peak of the sinewave. Random events are arcing or sparking. The usual way of quantifying partial discharge magnitude is in picocoulombs. The intensity of partial discharge is displayed versus time.

An automatic analysis of the reflectograms collected during the partial discharge measurement – using a method referred to as time domain reflectometry (TDR) – allows the location of insulation irregularities. They are displayed in a partial discharge mapping format.

A phase-related depiction of the partial discharges provides additional information, useful for the evaluation of the device under test.

=== Calibration setup ===
The actual charge change that occurs due to a PD event is not directly measurable, therefore, apparent charge is used instead. The apparent charge (q) of a PD event is the charge that, if injected between the terminals of the device under test, would change the voltage across the terminals by an amount equivalent to the PD event. This can be modeled by the equation:

$$q= C_b \Delta(V_c)$$

Apparent charge is not equal to the actual amount of changing charge at the PD site, but can be directly measured and calibrated. 'Apparent charge' is usually expressed in picocoulombs.

This is measured by calibrating the voltage of the spikes against the voltages obtained from a calibration unit discharged into the measuring instrument. The calibration unit is quite simple in operation and merely comprises a square wave generator in series with a capacitor connected across the sample. Usually these are triggered optically to enable calibration without entering a dangerous high voltage area. Calibrators are usually disconnected during the discharge testing.

=== Laboratory methods ===
- Wideband PD detection circuits
  In wideband detection, the impedance usually comprises a low Q parallel-resonant RLC circuit. This circuit tends to attenuate the exciting voltage (usually between 50 and 60 Hz) and amplify the voltage generated due to the discharges.
- Tuned (narrow band) detection circuits
- Differential discharge bridge methods
- Acoustic and Ultrasonic methods

=== Field testing methods ===
Field measurements preclude the use of a Faraday cage and the energising supply can also be a compromise from the ideal. Field measurements are therefore prone to noise and may be consequently less sensitive.

Factory quality PD tests in the field require equipment that may not be readily available, therefore other methods have been developed for field measurement which, while not as sensitive or accurate as standardized measurements, are substantially more convenient. By necessity field measurements have to be quick, safe and simple if they are to be widely applied by owners and operators of MV and HV assets.

Transient Earth Voltages (TEVs) are induced voltage spikes on the surface of the surrounding metalwork. TEVs were first discovered in 1974 by Dr John Reeves of EA Technology. TEVs occur because the partial discharge creates current spikes in the conductor and hence also in the earthed metal surrounding the conductor. Dr John Reeves established that TEV signals are directly proportional to the condition of the insulation for all switchgear of the same type measured at the same point. TEV signals are measured in mV and typically displayed in dBmV. TEV pulses are full of high frequency components and hence the earthed metalwork presents a considerable impedance to ground. Therefore, voltage spikes are generated. These will stay on the inner surface of surrounding metalwork (to a depth of approximately 0.5 μm in mild steel at 100 MHz) and loop around to the outer surface wherever there is an electrical discontinuity in the metalwork. There is a secondary effect whereby electromagnetic waves generated by the partial discharge also generate TEVs on the surrounding metalwork – the surrounding metalwork acting like an antenna. TEVs are a very convenient phenomenon for measuring and detecting partial discharges as they can be detected without making an electrical connection or removing any panels. While this method may be useful to detect some issues in switchgear and surface tracking on internal components, the sensitivity is not likely to be sufficient to detect issues within solid dielectric cable systems.

Ultrasonic measurement relies on fact that the partial discharge will emit sound waves. The frequency for emissions is "white" noise in nature and therefore produces ultrasonic structure waves through the solid or liquid filled electrical component. Using a structure borne ultrasonic sensor on the exterior of the item under examination, internal partial discharge can be detected and located when the sensor is placed closest to the source.

HFCT Method This method is ideal for detecting and determining the severity of the PD by burst interval measurement. The closer the bursts get to "zero voltage crossing" the more severe and critical the PD fault is. Location of the fault area is accomplished using AE described above.

Electro Magnetic Field detection picks up the radio waves generated by the partial discharge. As noted before the radio waves can generate TEVs on the surrounding metalwork. More sensitive measurement, particularly at higher voltages, can be achieved using in built UHF antennas or external antenna mounted on insulating spacers in the surrounding metalwork.

Directional Coupler detection picks up the signals emanating from a partial discharge. This method is ideal for joints and accessories, with the sensors being located on the semicon layers at the joint or accessory.

== Effects of partial discharge in insulation systems ==
Once begun, PD causes progressive deterioration of insulating materials, ultimately leading to electrical breakdown. The effects of PD within high voltage cables and equipment can be very serious, ultimately leading to complete failure. The cumulative effect of partial discharges within solid dielectrics is the formation of numerous, branching partially conducting discharge channels, a process called treeing. Repetitive discharge events cause irreversible mechanical and chemical deterioration of the insulating material. Damage is caused by the energy dissipated by high energy electrons or ions, ultraviolet light from the discharges, ozone attacking the void walls, and cracking as the chemical breakdown processes liberate gases at high pressure. The chemical transformation of the dielectric also tends to increase the electrical conductivity of the dielectric material surrounding the voids. This increases the electrical stress in the (thus far) unaffected gap region, accelerating the breakdown process. A number of inorganic dielectrics, including glass, porcelain, and mica, are significantly more resistant to PD damage than organic and polymer dielectrics.

In paper-insulated high-voltage cables, partial discharges begin as small pinholes penetrating the paper windings that are adjacent to the electrical conductor or outer sheath. As PD activity progresses, the repetitive discharges eventually cause permanent chemical changes within the affected paper layers and impregnating dielectric fluid. Over time, partially conducting carbonized trees are formed. This places greater stress on the remaining insulation, leading to further growth of the damaged region, resistive heating along the tree, and further charring (sometimes called tracking). This eventually culminates in the complete dielectric failure of the cable and, typically, an electrical explosion.

Partial discharges dissipate energy in the form of heat, sound, and light. Localized heating from PD may cause thermal degradation of the insulation. Although the level of PD heating is generally low for DC and power line frequencies, it can accelerate failures within high voltage high-frequency equipment. The integrity of insulation in high voltage equipment can be confirmed by monitoring the PD activities that occur through the equipment's life. To ensure supply reliability and long-term operational sustainability, PD in high-voltage electrical equipment should be monitored closely with early warning signals for inspection and maintenance.

PD can usually be prevented through careful design and material selection. In critical high voltage equipment, the integrity of the insulation is confirmed using PD detection equipment during the manufacturing stage as well as periodically through the equipment's useful life. PD prevention and detection are essential to ensure reliable, long-term operation of high voltage equipment used by electric power utilities.

== Monitoring partial discharge events in transformers and reactors ==
Utilizing UHF couplers and sensors, partial discharge signals are detected and carried to a master control unit where a filtering process is applied to reject interference. The amplitude and frequency of the UHF partial discharge pulses are digitized, analyzed and processed in order to generate an appropriate partial discharge data output, supervisory control and data acquisition (SCADA) alarm. Depending on the provider of the system, the partial discharge outputs are accessible through either a local area network, via modem or even a via web-based viewer.

The ability to differentiate between various types of partial discharge (PD) and accurately locate them is crucial for effective PD testing and monitoring. This capability enables corrective repairs to be performed during planned outages, preventing failures that often lead to expensive outages and associated downtime or production loss.

== Effects of partial discharge in rotating machines ==
The insulation system is essential to the performance and durability of rotating machines, as this can impact the service life of motors and generators. Partial discharge activity typically indicates a sign of insulation degradation and possible insulation failure.

Voids within a stator winding insulation can lead to manufacturing inconsistencies, thermal expansion, or mechanical stresses. These voids amplify the electric field which triggers partial discharge activity.

Detecting partial discharge signals at an early stage enables corrective measures taken before they escalate into catastrophic failure. Proactive monitoring of partial discharge activity helps minimise unplanned outages, extend asset life, and improve the reliability of the overall system.

Offline partial discharge testing is conducted when the equipment is de-energised, and each winding is energised individually using an external high-voltage source. This is ideal for detailed analysis during planned maintenance, as it provides a controlled environment to isolate partial discharge sources by gradually increasing the voltage in incremental steps up to the withstand test level, while monitoring the partial discharge activity.

On-line partial discharge testing can be applied across high voltage equipment including motors, generators, cables, switchgear and transformers. Using sensors such as HFCTs, testing can be conducted without requiring shutdown.

== International standards and informative guides ==
- IEC 60060-2 : 1989 High-voltage test techniques — Part 2: Measuring systems
- IEC 60270:2000/BS EN 60270:2001 "High-Voltage Test Techniques – Partial Discharge Measurements"
- IEC 61934:2006 "Electrical insulating materials and systems - Electrical measurement of PD under short rise time and repetitive voltage impulses"
- IEC 60664-4:2007 "Insulation coordination for equipment within low-voltage systems – Part 4: Consideration of high-frequency voltage stress"
- IEC 60034-27:2007 "Rotating electrical machines – Off-line partial discharge measurements on the stator winding insulation of rotating electrical machines"
- IEEE Std 436™-1991 (R2007) "IEEE Guide for Making Corona (Partial Discharge) Measurements on Electronics Transformers"
- IEEE 1434–2000 "IEEE Trial-Use Guide to the Measurement of Partial Discharges in Rotating Machinery"
- IEEE 400-2001 "IEEE Guide for Field Testing and Evaluation of the Insulation of Shielded Power Cable Systems"
- PD IEC/TS 62478:2016 "High-Voltage Test Techniques – Measurement of partial discharges by electromagnetic and acoustic methods"

== See also ==
- Condition-based maintenance
- Condition monitoring
- Dissolved gas analysis
- Electric generator
- Electric motor
- Electric power distribution
- Electric power transmission
- Electrical substation
- Electrical treeing
- Switchgear
- Transformer
- Electrostatic discharge
- Electrical measurements

== Bibliography ==
- High Voltage Engineering Fundamentals, E.Kuffel, W.S. Zaengl, pub. Pergamon Press. First edition, 1992 ISBN 0-08-024213-8
- Engineering Dielectrics, Volume IIA, Electrical Properties of Solid Insulating Materials: Molecular Structure and Electrical Behavior, R. Bartnikas, R. M Eichhorn, ASTM Special Technical Publication 783, ASTM, 1982
- Engineering Dielectrics, Volume I, Corona Measurement and Interpretation, R. Bartnikas, E. J. McMahon, ASTM Special Technical Publication 669, ASTM, 1979, ISBN 0-8031-0332-8
- Electricity Today, May 2009, Page 28 – 29
- Pommerenke D., Strehl T., Heinrich R., Kalkner W., Schmidt F., Weißenberg W.: Discrimination between Internal PD and other Pulses using Directional Coupling Sensors on High Voltage Cable Systems, IEEE Transactions on Dielectrics and Electrical Insulation, Vol.6, No 6, December 99, pp. 814–824
