= Buchholz relay =

Safety device for transformers

In electric power distribution and transmission, a Buchholz relay is a safety device mounted on some oil-filled power transformers and reactors, equipped with an external overhead oil reservoir called a "conservator".

The Buchholz relay is used as a protective device sensitive to the effects of dielectric failure inside the equipment. A generic designation for this type of device is "gas detector relay".

The relay was first developed by Max Buchholz (1875–1956) in 1921.

== Application ==
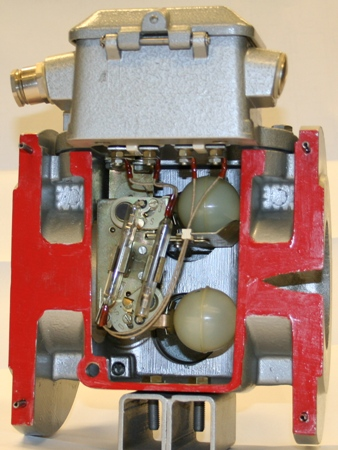
Two ball-shaped floats and two glass-enclosed reed switches are visible inside this cutaway view of a Buchholz relay

Buchholz relays have been applied on oil-filled power and distribution transformers at least since the 1940s. The relay is connected to the oil piping between the overhead conservator tank and the main oil tank of a transformer. The piping between the main tank and conservator is arranged so that any gas evolved in the main tank tends to flow upward toward the conservator and gas detector relay.

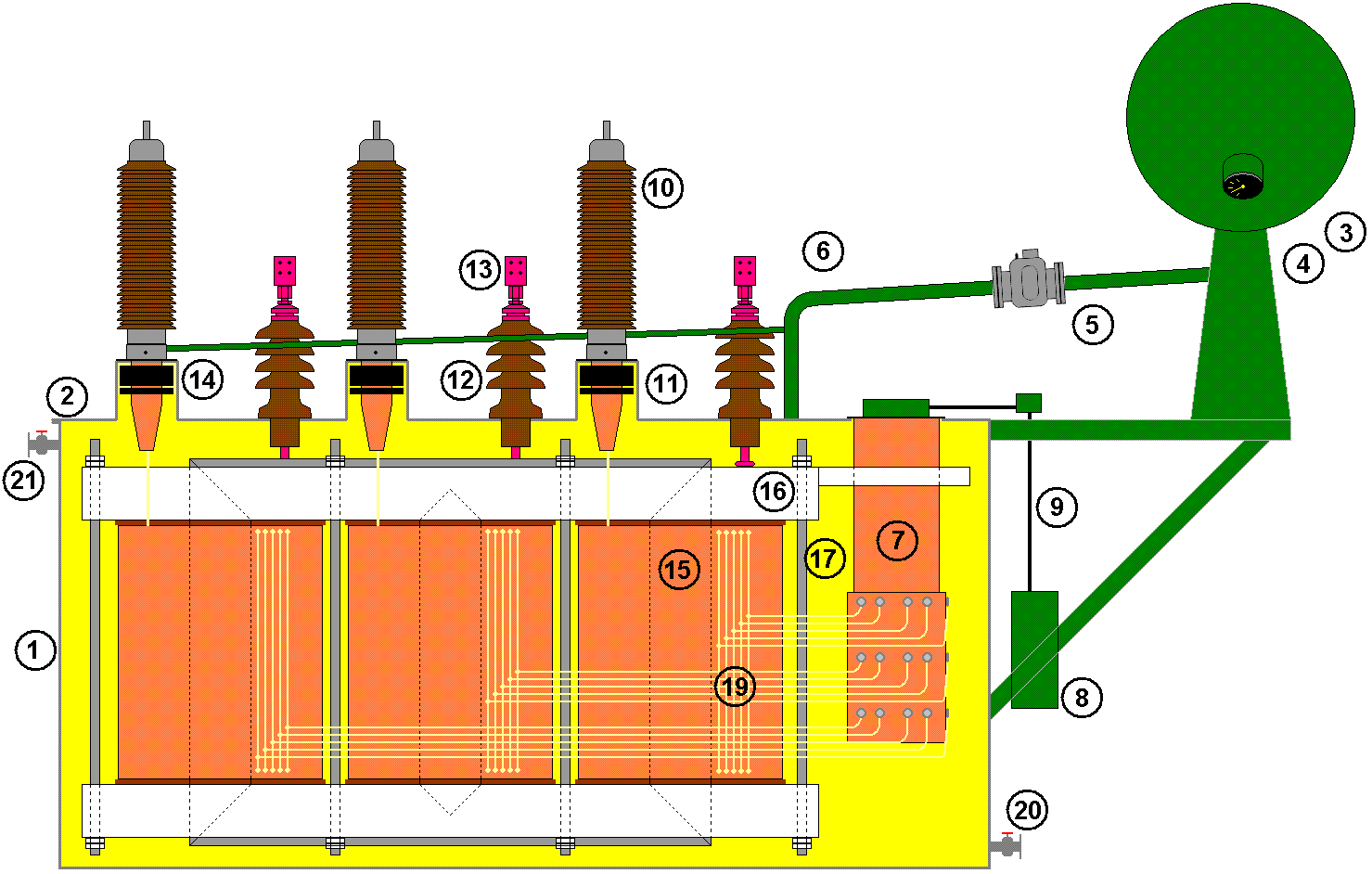
Schematic diagram of a large oil-filled power transformer. The conservator tank, green, at right, is marked 3 and the Buchholz relay is marked 5

Buchholz relays have also been used in electric trains that operate on AC Electrified lines, including locomotives and multiple units. These trains take a high voltage supply from overhead wires, at up to 25,000 volts AC, which is then fed to an oil cooled transformer that 'steps down' the supply to voltage suitable for use in the trains traction motors - usually between 750 and 1000 volts. Depending on the age and design of the equipment, this voltage may then be rectified to Direct Current. A Buchholz Relay is installed in the transformer oil circuit, and should the relay detect 'gassing' of the oil, will trip out the trains main circuit breaker, so isolating the equipment from the supply and therefore protecting the equipment from overheating or short circuiting. Once tripped, the equipment can only be reset by maintenance staff.

== Operation ==
Depending on the model, the relay has multiple methods to detect a failing transformer. On a slow accumulation of gas, due perhaps to slight overload, gas produced by decomposition of insulating oil accumulates in the top of the relay and forces the oil level down. A float switch in the relay is used to initiate an alarm signal. Depending on design, a second float may also serve to detect slow oil leaks.

If an electrical arc forms, gas accumulation is rapid, and oil flows rapidly into the conservator. This flow of oil operates a switch attached to a vane located in the path of the moving oil. This switch normally will operate a circuit breaker to isolate the apparatus before the fault causes additional damage. Buchholz relays have a test port to allow the accumulated gas to be withdrawn for testing. Flammable gas found in the relay indicates some internal fault such as overheating or arcing, whereas air found in the relay may only indicate low oil level or a leak.

Through a connected gas sampling device the control can also be made from the ground. Depending on the requirements, the Buchholz relay has a flange or threaded connection. The classic Buchholz relay has to comply with the requirements of the DIN EN 50216-2 standard. Depending on the requirements, it is equipped with up to four (2 per float) switches or change-over switches, which can either send a light signal or switch off the transformer.

== See also ==
- Relay
