= Electrical treeing =

Electrical pre-breakdown phenomenon

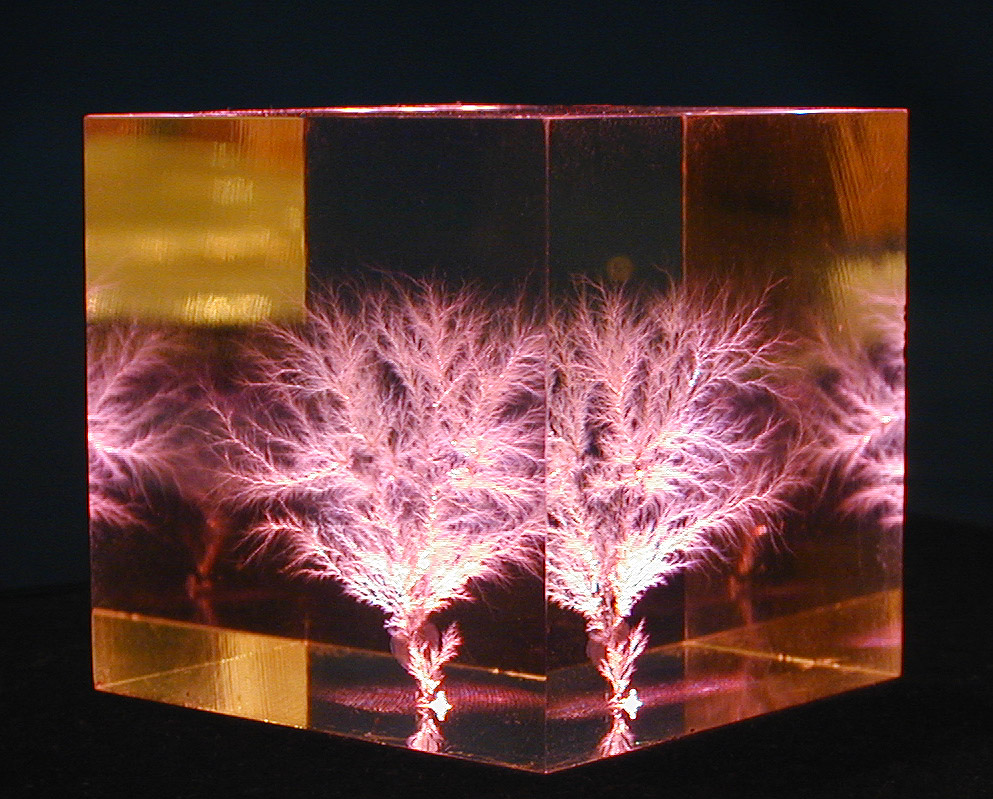
A 3D "Electrical Tree" (or Lichtenberg figure), embedded within a 1.5-inch cube of polymethyl methacrylate (PMMA)

In electrical engineering, treeing is an electrical pre-breakdown phenomenon in solid insulation. It is a damaging process due to partial discharges and progresses through the stressed dielectric insulation, in a path resembling the branches of a tree. Treeing of solid high-voltage cable insulation is a common breakdown mechanism and source of electrical faults in underground power cables.

== Other occurrences and causes ==
Electrical treeing is typically initiated and then propagates when a dry dielectric material is subjected to high and divergent electrical field stress over a long period of time. Electrical treeing is observed to originate at points where impurities, gas voids, mechanical defects, or conducting projections cause excessive electrical field stress within small regions of the dielectric. This can ionize gases within voids inside the bulk dielectric, creating small electrical discharges between the walls of the void. An impurity or defect may even result in the partial breakdown of the solid dielectric itself. Ultraviolet light and ozone from these partial discharges (PD) then react with the nearby dielectric, decomposing and further degrading its insulating capability. Gases are often liberated as the dielectric degrades, creating new voids and cracks. These defects further weaken the dielectric strength of the material, enhance the electrical stress, and accelerate the PD process.

=== Water trees and electrical trees ===
In the presence of water, a diffuse, partially conductive 3D plume-like structure, called a water tree, may form within the polyethylene dielectric used in buried or water-immersed high voltage cables. The plume is known to consist of a dense network of extremely small water-filled channels which are defined by the native crystalline structure of the polymer. Individual channels are extremely difficult to see using optical magnification, so their study usually requires using a scanning electron microscope (SEM).

Water trees begin as a microscopic region near a defect. They then grow under the continued presence of a high electrical field and water. Water trees may eventually grow to the point where they bridge the outer ground layer to the center high voltage conductor, at which point the stress redistributes across the insulation. Water trees are not generally a reliability concern unless they are able to initiate an electrical tree.

Another type of tree-like structure can form with or without the presence of water is called an electrical tree. It also forms within a polyethylene dielectric (as well as many other solid dielectrics). Electrical trees also originate where bulk or surface stress enhancements initiate dielectric breakdown in a small, highly-stressed region of the insulation. This permanently damages the insulating material in that region. Further tree growth then occurs through as additional small electrical breakdown events (called partial discharges). Electrical tree growth may be accelerated by transient voltage changes or reversals, such as utility switching operations. Also, cables injected with high voltage DC may also develop electrical trees over time as electrical charges migrate into the dielectric nearest the HV conductor. The region of injected charge (called a space charge) amplifies the electrical field in the dielectric, stimulating further stress enhancement and the initiation of electrical trees as the site of pre-existing stress enhancements. Since the electrical tree itself is typically partially conducting, its presence also increases the electrical stress in the remaining region between the tree and the opposite conductor.

Unlike water trees, the individual channels of electrical trees are larger and more easily seen. Treeing has been a long-term failure mechanism for buried polymer-insulated high voltage power cables, first reported in 1969. In a similar fashion, 2D trees can occur along the surface of a highly stressed dielectric, or across a dielectric surface that has been contaminated by dust or mineral salts. Over time, these partially conductive trails can grow until they cause complete failure of the dielectric. Electrical tracking, sometimes called dry banding, is a typical failure mechanism for electrical power insulators that are subjected to salt spray contamination along coastlines. The branching 2D and 3D patterns are sometimes called Lichtenberg figures.

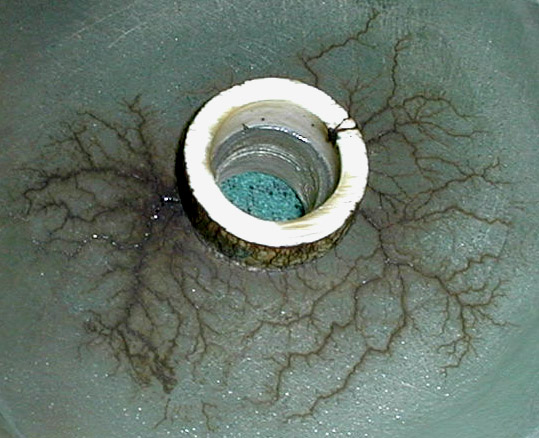
2D carbonized electrical trees (or tracking) across the surface of a polycarbonate plate that was part of a trigatron. These partially conducting paths ultimately led to premature breakdown and operational failure of the device

Electrical treeing or "Lichtenberg figures" also occur in high-voltage equipment just before breakdown. Following these Lichtenberg figures in the insulation during postmortem investigation of the broken down insulation can be most useful in finding the cause of breakdown. An experienced high-voltage engineer can see from the direction and the type of trees and their branches where the primary cause of the breakdown was situated and possibly find the cause. Broken-down transformers, high-voltage cables, bushings, and other equipment can usefully be investigated in this way; the insulation is unrolled (in the case of paper insulation) or sliced in thin slices (in the case of solid insulation systems), the results are sketched and photographed and form a useful archive of the breakdown process.

== Types of electrical trees ==
Electrical trees can be further categorized depending on the different tree patterns. These include dendrites, branch type, bush type, spikes, strings, bow-ties and vented trees. The two most commonly found tree types are bow-tie trees and vented trees.

Bow-tie trees
Bow-tie trees are trees which start to grow from within the dielectric insulation and grow symmetrically outwards toward the electrodes. As the trees start within the insulation, they have no free supply of air which will enable continuous support of partial discharges. Thus, these trees have discontinuous growth, which is why the bow-tie trees usually do not grow long enough to fully bridge the entire insulation between the electrodes, therefore causing no failure in the insulation.

Vented trees
Vented trees are trees which initiate at an electrode insulation interface and grow towards the opposite electrode. Having access to free air is a very important factor for the growth of the vented trees. These trees are able to grow continuously until they are long enough to bridge the electrodes, therefore causing failure in the insulation.

== Detection and location of electrical trees ==
Electrical trees can be detected and located by means of partial discharge measurement.

As the measurement values of this method allow no absolute interpretation, data collected during the procedure is compared to measurement values of the same cable gathered during the test. This allows simple and quick classification of the dielectric condition (new, strongly aged, faulty) of the cable under test.

To measure the level of partial discharges, 50–60 Hz or sometimes a sinusoidal 0.1 Hz VLF (very low frequency) voltage may be used. The turn-on voltage, a major measurement criterion, can vary by over 100% between 50 and 60 Hz measurements as compared to 0.1 Hz VLF (very low frequency) Sinusoidal AC source at the power frequency (50–60 Hz) as mandated by IEEE standards 48, 404, 386, and ICEA standards S-97-682, S-94-649 and S-108-720. Modern PD-detection systems employ digital signal processing software for analysis and display of measurement results.

An analysis of the PD signals collected during the measurement with the proper equipment can allow for the vast majority of location of insulation defects. Usually they are displayed in a partial discharge mapping format. Additional useful information about the device under test can be derived from a phase related depiction of the partial discharges.

A sufficient measurement report contains:

- Calibration pulse (in accordance with IEC 60270) and end detection
- Background noise of the measurement arrangement
- Partial discharge inception voltage PDIV
- Partial discharge level at 1.7 Vo
- Partial discharge extinction voltage PDEV
- Phase-resolved partial discharge pattern PRPD for advanced interpretation of partial discharge behavior (optional)

== See also ==
- Cross-linked polyethylene
- High-voltage cable
- Lichtenberg figure
- Partial discharge
