= Transformer oil =

Highly refined mineral oil

Transformer oil or insulating oil is an oil that is stable at high temperatures and has excellent electrical insulating properties. It is used in oil-filled wet transformers, some types of high-voltage capacitors, fluorescent lamp ballasts, and some types of high-voltage switches and circuit breakers. It functions to insulate, suppress corona discharge and arcing, and serves as a coolant.

Most often, transformer oil is based on mineral oil, but alternative formulations with different engineering or environmental properties are growing in popularity.

== Function and properties ==
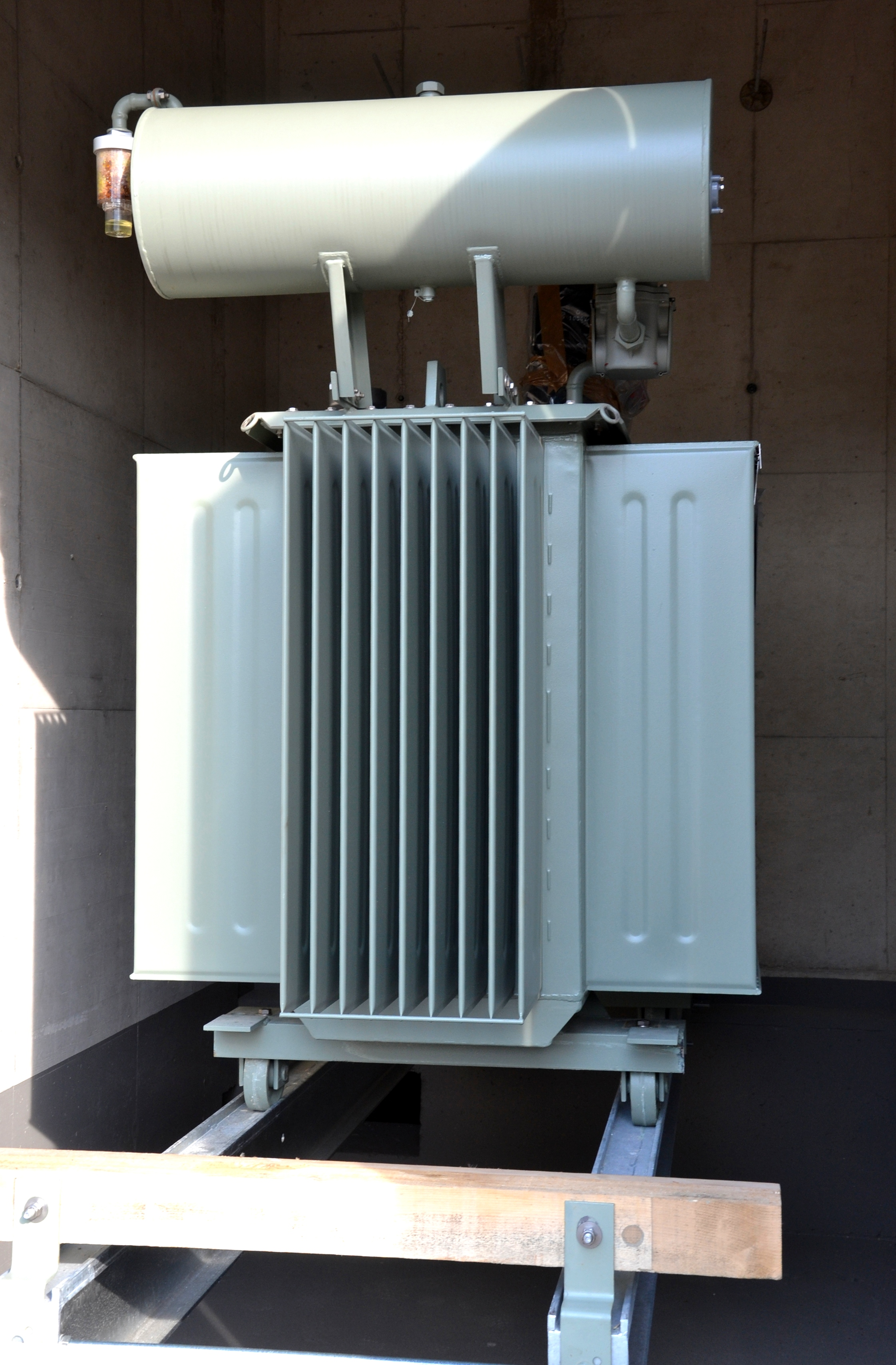
Oil transformer with air convection cooled heat exchangers in the front and at the side

Transformer oil's primary functions are to insulate and cool a transformer. It must therefore have high dielectric strength, thermal conductivity, and chemical stability, and must keep these properties when held at high temperatures for extended periods. Typically, they have a flash point greater than 140 °C (284 °F), pour point less than −40 °C (−40 °F), and a dielectric breakdown at greater than 28 kV_{RMS}. To improve cooling of large power transformers, the oil-filled tank may have external radiators through which the oil circulates by natural convection. Power transformers with capacities of thousands of kilovolt-ampere may also have cooling fans, oil pumps, and even oil-to-water heat exchangers.

Power transformers undergo prolonged drying processes, using electrical self-heating, the application of a vacuum, or both to ensure that the transformer is completely free of water vapor before the insulating oil is introduced. This helps prevent corona formation and subsequent electrical breakdown under load.

Oil filled transformers with a conservator oil reservoir may have a gas detector relay like a Buchholz relay. These safety devices detect the buildup of gas inside the transformer due to corona discharge, overheating, or an internal electric arc. On a slow accumulation of gas, or rapid pressure rise, these devices can trip a protective circuit breaker to remove power from the transformer. Transformers without conservators are usually equipped with sudden pressure relays, which perform a similar function as the Buchholz relay.

== Mineral oil alternatives ==
Mineral oil is generally effective as a transformer oil, but it has some disadvantages, one of which is its relatively low flashpoint versus some alternatives. If a transformer leaks mineral oil, it can potentially start a fire. Fire codes often require that transformers inside buildings use a less flammable liquid, or the use of dry-type transformers with no liquid at all. Mineral oil is also an environmental contaminant, and its insulating properties are rapidly degraded by even small amounts of water. Transformers are well equipped to keep water outside the oil for this reason.

Pentaerythritol tetra fatty acid synthetic and natural esters have emerged as an increasingly common mineral oil alternative, especially in high-fire-risk applications such as indoors due to their high fire point, which are over 300 °C (572 °F). They are biodegradable, but are more expensive than mineral oil. Natural esters have lower oxidation stability in the 120C oxygen saturated test of approximately 48-hours compared to 500-hours for Mineral oils, and are therefore used in closed transformers. Ester oils do tend to show higher moisture content than mineral oil.

Hermetic seals are important for larger transformers due to thermal expansion and contraction. Mid-size and large power transformers will typically have a conservator and employ a rubber bag with the use of natural ester to reduce oxygen ingress and prevent the natural ester from experiencing a faster oxidation than utilities are accustomed to with mineral oils. Silicone or fluorocarbon-based oils, which are even less flammable, are also used, but they are more expensive than esters.

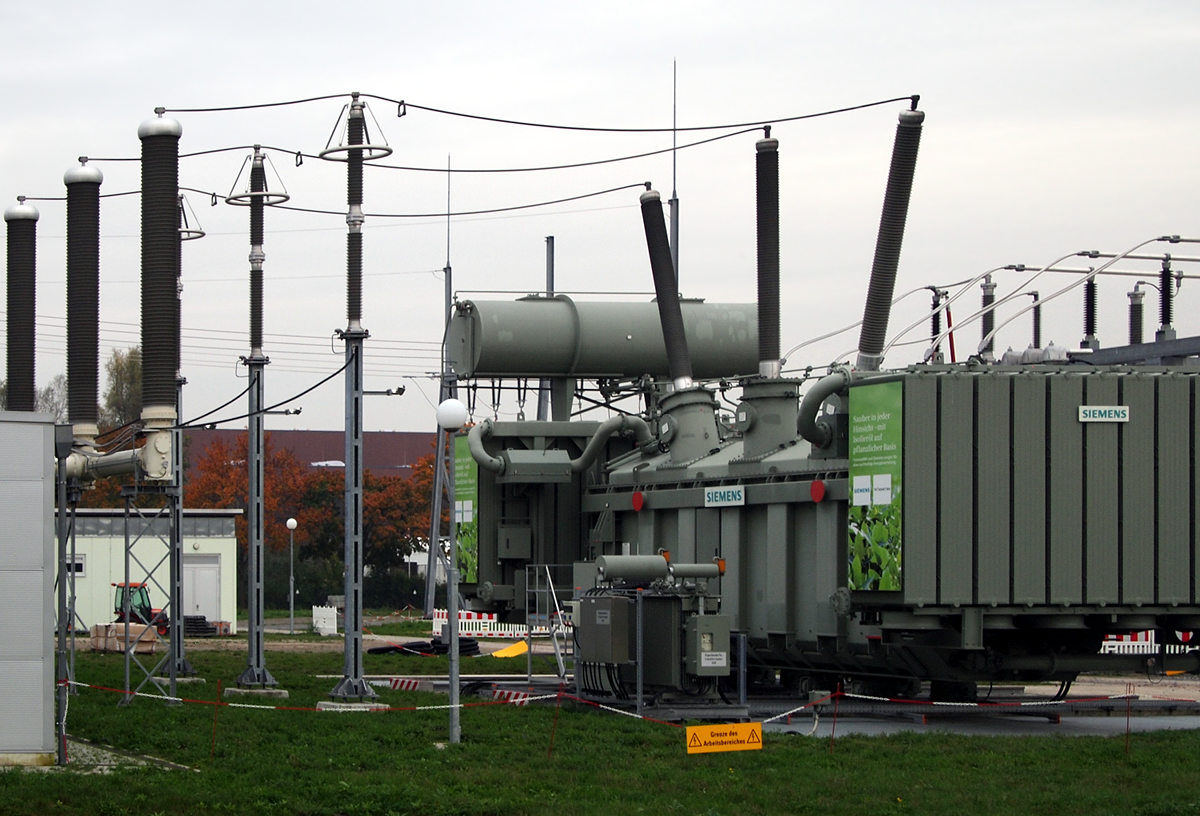
A 380 kV transformer with vegetable oil

There are over 3 million transformers in service with vegetable-based formulations, using soy or rapeseed based formulations in up to 500 kV transformers so far. However, coconut oil-based formulations are unsuitable for use in cold climates or for voltages over 230 kV. Researchers are also investigating nanofluids for transformer use; these would be used as additives to improve the stability and thermal and electrical properties of the oil.

== Polychlorinated biphenyls (PCBs) ==
Polychlorinated biphenyls (PCB) are synthetic dielectrics first made over a century ago and found to have desirable properties that led to their widespread use. Polychlorinated biphenyls were formerly used as transformer oil, since they have high dielectric strength and are not flammable. Unfortunately, they are also toxic, bioaccumulative, not at all biodegradable, and difficult to dispose of safely. When burned, they form even more toxic products, such as chlorinated dioxins and chlorinated dibenzofurans.

Beginning in the 1970s, production and new uses of PCBs were banned in many countries, due to concerns about the accumulation of PCBs and toxicity of their byproducts. For instance, in the US, production of PCBs was banned in 1979 under the Toxic Substances Control Act. In many countries significant programs are in place to reclaim and safely destroy PCB contaminated equipment. One method that can be used to reclaim PCB contaminated transformer oil is the application of a PCB removal system, also called a PCB dechlorination system.

PCB removal systems use an alkali dispersion to strip the chlorine atoms from the other molecules in a chemical reaction. This forms PCB-free transformer oil and a PCB-free sludge. The two can then be separated via a centrifuge. The sludge can be disposed as regular non-PCB industrial waste. The treated transformer oil is fully restored, meeting the required standards, without any detectable PCB content. It can, thus, be used as the insulating fluid in transformers again.

PCBs and mineral oil are miscible in all proportions, and sometimes the same equipment (drums, pumps, hoses, and so on) was used for either type of liquid, so PCB contamination of transformer oil continues to be a concern. For instance, under present regulations, concentrations of PCBs exceeding 5 parts per million can cause an oil to be classified as hazardous waste in California.

== Testing and oil quality ==
Transformer oils are subject to electrical and mechanical stresses while a transformer is in operation. In addition there is contamination caused by chemical interactions with windings and other solid insulation, catalyzed by high operating temperature. The original chemical properties of transformer oil change gradually, rendering it ineffective for its intended purpose after many years.

Oil in large transformers and electrical apparatus is periodically tested for its electrical and chemical properties, to make sure it is suitable for further use. Sometimes oil condition can be improved by filtration and treatment. Tests can be divided into:

1. Dissolved gas analysis
2. Furan analysis
3. PCB analysis
4. General electrical & physical tests:
  - Color & Appearance
  - Breakdown Voltage
  - Water Content
  - Acidity (Neutralization Value)
  - Dielectric Dissipation Factor
  - Resistivity
  - Sediments & Sludge
  - Flash Point
  - Pour Point
  - Density
  - Kinematic Viscosity

The details of conducting these tests are available in standards released by International Electrotechnical Commission, ASTM International, International standard, British Standards, and testing can be done by any of the methods. The Furan and DGA tests are specifically not for determining the quality of transformer oil, but for determining any abnormalities in the internal windings of the transformer or the paper insulation of the transformer, which cannot be otherwise detected without a complete overhaul of the transformer. Suggested intervals for these test are:

- General and physical tests - bi-yearly
- Dissolved gas analysis - yearly
- Furan testing - once every 2 years, subject to the transformer being in operation for min 5 years.

== On-site testing ==
Some transformer oil tests can be carried out in the field, using portable test apparatus. Other tests, such as dissolved gas, normally require a sample to be sent to a laboratory. Electronic on-line dissolved gas detectors can be connected to important or distressed transformers to continually monitor gas generation trends.

To determine the insulating property of the dielectric oil, an oil sample is taken from the device under test, and its breakdown voltage is measured on-site according to the following test sequence:

- In the vessel, two standard-compliant test electrodes with a typical clearance of 2.5 mm are surrounded by the insulating oil.
- During the test, a test voltage is applied to the electrodes. The test voltage is continuously increased up to the breakdown voltage with a constant slew rate of e.g. 2 kV/s.
- Breakdown occurs in an electric arc, leading to a collapse of the test voltage.
- Immediately after ignition of the arc, the test voltage is switched off automatically.
- Ultra fast switch off is crucial, as the energy that is brought into the oil and is burning it during the breakdown, must be limited to keep the additional pollution by carbonisation as low as possible.
- The root mean square value of the test voltage is measured at the very instant of the breakdown and is reported as the breakdown voltage.
- After the test is completed, the insulating oil is stirred automatically and the test sequence is performed repeatedly.
- The resulting breakdown voltage is calculated as mean value of the individual measurements.

== See also ==
- Heat-transfer oil
