= Paschen's law =

Physical law about electrical discharge in gases

Paschen curves obtained for helium, neon, argon, hydrogen and nitrogen, using the expression for the breakdown voltage as a function of the parameters A,B that interpolate the first Townsend coefficient.

Paschen's law is an equation that gives the breakdown voltage– the voltage necessary to start a discharge or electric arc –between two electrodes in a gas as a function of pressure and gap length. It is named after Friedrich Paschen who discovered it empirically in 1889.

Paschen studied the breakdown voltage of various gases between parallel metal plates as the gas pressure and gap distance were varied:

- With a constant gap length, the voltage necessary to arc across the gap decreased as the pressure was reduced and then increased gradually, exceeding its original value.
- With a constant pressure, the voltage needed to cause an arc reduced as the gap size was reduced but only to a point. As the gap was reduced further, the voltage required to cause an arc began to rise and again exceeded its original value.

For a given gas, the voltage is a function only of the product of the pressure and gap length. The curve he found of voltage versus the pressure-gap length product (right) is called Paschen's curve. He found an equation that fit these curves, which is now called Paschen's law.

At higher pressures and gap lengths, the breakdown voltage is approximately proportional to the product of pressure and gap length, and the term Paschen's law is sometimes used to refer to this simpler relation. However, this is only roughly true, over a limited range of the curve.

== Paschen curve ==
Early vacuum experimenters found a rather surprising behavior. An arc would sometimes take place in a long irregular path rather than at the minimal distance between the electrodes. For example, in air, at a pressure of one atmosphere, the distance for minimal breakdown voltage is about 7.5 μm. The voltage required to arc this distance is 327 V, which is insufficient to ignite the arcs for gaps that are either wider or narrower. For a 3.5 μm gap, the required voltage is 533 V, nearly twice as much. If 500 V were applied, it would not be sufficient to arc at the 2.85 μm distance, but would arc at a 7.5 μm distance.

Paschen found that breakdown voltage was described by the equation

$$V_\text{B} = \frac{Bpd}{\ln(Apd) - \ln\left[\ln\left(1 + \frac{1}{\gamma_\text{se}}\right)\right]}$$

where $V_\text{B}$ is the breakdown voltage in volts, $p$ is the pressure in pascals, $d$ is the gap distance in meters, $\gamma_\text{se}$ is the secondary-electron-emission coefficient (the number of secondary electrons produced per incident positive ion), $A$ is the saturation ionization in the gas at a particular $E/p$ (electric field/pressure), and $B$ is related to the excitation and ionization energies.

The constants $A$ and $B$ interpolate the first Townsend coefficient $\alpha=Ap e^{-Bp/E}$. They are determined experimentally and found to be roughly constant over a restricted range of $E/p$ for any given gas. For example, air with an $E/p$ in the range of 450 to 7500 V/(kPa·cm), $A$ = 112.50 (kPa·cm)^{−1} and $B$ = 2737.50 V/(kPa·cm).

The graph of this equation is the Paschen curve. By differentiating it with respect to $pd$ and setting the derivative to zero, the minimal voltage can be found. This yields

$$pd = \frac{e \cdot \ln\left(1+\frac{1}{{\mathit{\gamma}}_{se}}\right)}{A}$$

and predicts the occurrence of a minimal breakdown voltage for $pd$ = 7.5×10^{−6} m·atm. This is 327 V in air at standard atmospheric pressure at a distance of 7.5 μm.

The composition of the gas determines both the minimal arc voltage and the distance at which it occurs. For argon, the minimal arc voltage is 137 V at a larger 12 μm. For sulfur dioxide, the minimal arc voltage is 457 V at only 4.4 μm.

=== Long gaps ===
For air at standard conditions for temperature and pressure (STP), the voltage needed to arc a 1-metre gap is about 3.4 MV. The intensity of the electric field for this gap is therefore 3.4 MV/m.

The electric field needed to arc across the minimal-voltage gap is much greater than what is necessary to arc a gap of one metre. At large gaps (or large pd) Paschen's Law is known to fail. The Meek Criteria for breakdown is usually used for large gaps. It takes into account non-uniformity in the electric field and formation of streamers due to the build up of charge within the gap that can occur over long distances. For a 7.5 μm gap the arc voltage is 327 V, which is 43 MV/m. This is about 14 times greater than the field strength for the 1.5-metre gap. The phenomenon is well verified experimentally and is referred to as the Paschen minimum.

The equation loses accuracy for gaps under about 10 μm in air at one atmosphere and incorrectly predicts an infinite arc voltage at a gap of about 2.7 μm. Breakdown voltage can also differ from the Paschen curve prediction for very small electrode gaps, when field emission from the cathode surface becomes important.

== Physical mechanism ==
The mean free path of a molecule in a gas is the average distance between its collision with other molecules. This is inversely proportional to the pressure of the gas, given constant temperature. In air at STP the mean free path of molecules is about 96 nm. Since electrons are much smaller, their average distance between colliding with molecules is about 5.6 times longer, or about 0.5 μm. This is a substantial fraction of the 7.5 μm spacing between the electrodes for minimal arc voltage. If the electron is in an electric field of 43 MV/m, it will be accelerated and acquire 21.5 eV of energy in 0.5 μm of travel in the direction of the field. The first ionization energy needed to dislodge an electron from nitrogen molecule is about 15.6 eV. The accelerated electron will acquire more than enough energy to ionize a nitrogen molecule. This liberated electron will in turn be accelerated, which will lead to another collision. A chain reaction then leads to avalanche breakdown, and an arc takes place from the cascade of released electrons.

More collisions will take place in the electron path between the electrodes in a higher-pressure gas. When the pressure–gap product $pd$ is high, an electron will collide with many different gas molecules as it travels from the cathode to the anode. Each of the collisions randomizes the electron direction, so the electron is not always being accelerated by the electric field—sometimes it travels back towards the cathode and is decelerated by the field.

Collisions reduce the electron's energy and make it more difficult for it to ionize a molecule. Energy losses from a greater number of collisions require larger voltages for the electrons to accumulate sufficient energy to ionize many gas molecules, which is required to produce an avalanche breakdown.

On the left side of the Paschen minimum, the $pd$ product is small. The electron mean free path can become long compared to the gap between the electrodes. In this case, the electrons might gain large amounts of energy, but have fewer ionizing collisions. A greater voltage is therefore required to assure ionization of enough gas molecules to start an avalanche.

== Derivation ==
=== Basics ===
To calculate the breakthrough voltage, a homogeneous electrical field is assumed. This is the case for a parallel-plate capacitor. The electrodes may have the distance $d$. The cathode is located at the point $x = 0$.

To get impact ionization, the electron energy $E_e$ must become greater than the ionization energy $E_\text{I}$ of the gas atoms between the plates. Per length of path $x$ a number of $\alpha$ ionizations will occur. $\alpha$ is known as the first Townsend coefficient as it was introduced by Townsend. The increase of the electron current $\Gamma_e$, can be described for the assumed setup as

| $\Gamma_e(x = d) = \Gamma_e(x = 0)\,e^{\alpha d}.$ | 1 |

(So the number of free electrons at the anode is equal to the number of free electrons at the cathode that were multiplied by impact ionization. The larger $d$ and/or $\alpha$, the more free electrons are created.)

The number of created electrons is

| $\Gamma_e(d) - \Gamma_e(0) = \Gamma_e(0) \left(e^{\alpha d} - 1\right).$ | 2 |

Neglecting possible multiple ionizations of the same atom, the number of created ions is the same as the number of created electrons:

| $\Gamma_i(0) - \Gamma_i(d) = \Gamma_e(0) \left(e^{\alpha d} - 1\right).$ | 3 |

$\Gamma_i$ is the ion current. To keep the discharge going on, free electrons must be created at the cathode surface. This is possible because the ions hitting the cathode release secondary electrons at the impact. (For very large applied voltages also field electron emission can occur.) Without field emission, we can write

| $\Gamma_e(0) = \gamma \Gamma_i(0),$ | 4 |

where $\gamma$ is the mean number of generated secondary electrons per ion. This is also known as the second Townsend coefficient. Assuming that $\Gamma_i(d) = 0$, one gets the relation between the Townsend coefficients by putting (4) into (3) and transforming:

| $\alpha d = \ln\left(1 + \frac{1}{\gamma}\right).$ | 5 |

=== Impact ionization ===
What is the amount of $\alpha$? The number of ionization depends upon the probability that an electron hits a gas molecule. This probability $P$ is the relation of the cross-sectional area of a collision between electron and ion $\sigma$ in relation to the overall area $A$ that is available for the electron to fly through:

| $P = \frac{N\sigma}{A} = \frac{x}{\lambda}$ | 6 |

As expressed by the second part of the equation, it is also possible to express the probability as relation of the path traveled by the electron $x$ to the mean free path $\lambda$ (distance at which another collision occurs).

Visualization of the cross-section $\sigma$: If the center of particle b penetrates the blue circle, a collision occurs with particle a. So the area of the circle is the cross-section and its radius $r$ is the sum of the radii of the particles.

$N$ is the number of molecules which electrons can hit. It can be calculated using the equation of state of the ideal gas

| $p V = N k_{B} T$ | 7 |

($p$: pressure, $V$: volume, $k_B$: Boltzmann constant, $T$: temperature)

The adjoining sketch illustrates that $\sigma = \pi (r_a + r_b)^2$. As the radius of an electron can be neglected compared to the radius of an ion $r_I$ it simplifies to $\sigma = \pi r_I^2$. Using this relation, putting (7) into (6) and transforming to $\lambda$ one gets

| $\lambda = \frac{k_{B}T}{p\pi r_{I}^{2}}=\frac{1}{L\cdot p}$ | 8 |

where the factor $L$ was only introduced for a better overview.

The alteration of the current of not yet collided electrons at every point in the path $x$ can be expressed as

| $\mathrm{d}\Gamma_e(x) = -\Gamma_e(x)\,\frac{\mathrm{d}x}{\lambda_e}$ | 9 |

This differential equation can easily be solved:

| $\Gamma_e(x) = \Gamma_e(0)\,\exp{\left(-\frac{x}{\lambda_e}\right)}$ | 10 |

The probability that $\lambda > x$ (that there was not yet a collision at the point $x$) is

| $P(\lambda > x) = \frac{\Gamma_e(x)}{\Gamma_e(0)} = \exp{\left(-\frac{x}{\lambda_e}\right)}$ | 11 |

According to its definition $\alpha$ is the number of ionizations per length of path and thus the relation of the probability that there was no collision in the mean free path of the ions, and the mean free path of the electrons:

| $\alpha = \frac{P(\lambda > \lambda_I)}{\lambda_e} = \frac{1}{\lambda_e}\exp\left(-\frac{\lambda_{I}}{\lambda_{e}}\right) = \frac{1}{\lambda_e}\exp\left(-\frac{E_{I}}{E_{e}}\right)$ | 12 |

It was hereby considered that the energy $E$ that a charged particle can get between a collision depends on the electric field strength $\mathcal{E}$ and the charge $Q$:

| $E = \lambda Q\mathcal{E}$ | 13 |

=== Breakdown voltage ===
For the parallel-plate capacitor we have $\mathcal{E} = \frac{U}{d}$, where $U$ is the applied voltage. As a single ionization was assumed $Q$ is the elementary charge $e$. We can now put (13) and (8) into (12) and get

| $\alpha=L\cdot p\,\exp\left(-\frac{L\cdot p\cdot d\cdot E_{I}}{eU}\right)$ | 14 |

Putting this into (5) and transforming to $U$ we get the Paschen law for the breakdown voltage $U_{\mathrm{breakdown}}$ that was first investigated by Paschen in and whose formula was first derived by Townsend in

| $U_{\text{breakdown}}=\frac{L\cdot p\cdot d\cdot E_{I}}{e\left(\ln(L\cdot p\cdot d)-\ln\left(\ln\left(1+\gamma^{-1}\right)\right)\right)}\qquad\qquad(15)$ | 15 |

with $L = \frac{\pi r_{I}^{2}}{k_{B}T}$

=== Plasma ignition ===
Plasma ignition in the definition of Townsend (Townsend discharge) is a self-sustaining discharge, independent of an external source of free electrons. This means that electrons from the cathode can reach the anode in the distance $d$ and ionize at least one atom on their way. So according to the definition of $\alpha$ this relation must be fulfilled:

| $\alpha d \ge 1$ | 16 |

If $\alpha d = 1$ is used instead of (5) one gets for the breakdown voltage

| $U_{\mathrm{breakdown\,Townsend}} = \frac{L\cdot p\cdot d\cdot E_{I}}{e\cdot \ln(L\cdot p\cdot d)} = \frac{d\cdot E_{I}}{e\cdot \lambda_e\,\ln\left(\frac{d}{\lambda_e}\right)}$ | 17 |

== Conclusions, validity ==
Paschen's law requires that:

- There are already free electrons at the cathode ($\Gamma_e(x=0) \ne 0$) which can be accelerated to trigger impact ionization. Such so-called seed electrons can be created by ionization by natural radioactivity or cosmic rays.
- The creation of further free electrons is only achieved by impact ionization. Thus Paschen's law is not valid if there are external electron sources. This can, for example, be a light source creating secondary electrons by the photoelectric effect. This has to be considered in experiments.
- Each ionized atom leads to only one free electron. However, multiple ionizations occur always in practice.
- Free electrons at the cathode surface are created by the impacting ions. The problem is that the number of thereby created electrons strongly depends on the material of the cathode, its surface (roughness, impurities) and the environmental conditions (temperature, humidity etc.). The experimental, reproducible determination of the factor $\gamma$ is therefore nearly impossible.
- The electrical field is homogeneous.

== Effects with different gases ==
Different gases will have different mean free paths for molecules and electrons. This is because different molecules have ionization cross sections, that is, different effective diameters. Noble gases like helium and argon are monatomic, which makes them harder to ionize and tend to have smaller effective diameters. This gives them greater mean free paths.

Ionization potentials differ between molecules, as well as the speed that they recapture electrons after they have been knocked out of orbit. All three effects change the number of collisions needed to cause an exponential growth in free electrons. These free electrons are necessary to cause an arc.

== See also ==
- Dielectric strength
