= Dissolved gas analysis =

Examination of transformer oil contaminants

Dissolved gas analysis (DGA) is an examination of electrical transformer oil contaminants. Insulating materials within electrical equipment liberate gases as they slowly break down over time. The composition and distribution of these dissolved gases are indicators of the effects of deterioration, such as pyrolysis or partial discharge, and the rate of gas generation indicates the severity. DGA is beneficial to a preventive maintenance program.

The collection and analysis of gases in an oil-insulated transformer was discussed as early as 1928. As of 2018, many years of empirical and theoretical study have gone into the analysis of transformer fault gases.

DGA usually consists of sampling the oil and sending the sample to a laboratory for analysis. Mobile DGA units can be transported and used on site as well; some units can be directly connected to a transformer. Online monitoring of electrical equipment is an integral part of the smart grid.

== Oil ==
Large power transformers are filled with oil that cools and insulates the transformer windings. Mineral oil is the most common type in outdoor transformers; fire-resistant fluids also used include polychlorinated biphenyls (PCB)s and silicone.

The insulating liquid is in contact with the internal components. Gases, formed by normal and abnormal events within the transformer, are dissolved in the oil. By analyzing the volume, types, proportions, and rate of production of dissolved gases, much diagnostic information can be gathered. Since these gases can reveal the faults of a transformer, they are known as "fault gases". Gases are produced by oxidation, vaporization, insulation decomposition, oil breakdown and electrolytic action.

== Sampling ==
=== Oil sample tube ===
An oil sample tube is used to draw, retain and transport the sample of transformer oil in the same condition as it is inside a transformer with all fault gases dissolved in it.

It is a gas tight borosilicate glass tube of capacity 150 ml or 250 ml, having two airtight Teflon valves on both the ends. The outlets of these valves have been provided with a screw thread which helps in convenient connection of synthetic tubes while drawing sample from transformer. Also this provision is useful in transferring the oil into Sample oil burette of the Multiple Gas Extractor without any exposure to atmosphere, thereby retaining all its dissolved and evolved fault gases contents.

It has a septum arrangement on one side of the tube for drawing sample oil to test its moisture content.

Thermo foam boxes are used to transport the above Oil Sample Tubes without any exposure to sunlight

=== Glass syringe ===
Oil syringes are another means of obtaining an oil sample from a transformer. The volume of the syringes have a large range but can be commonly found in the 50ml range. The quality and cleanliness of the syringe is important as it maintains the integrity of the sample before the analyses.

== Extraction ==
The DGA technique involves extracting or stripping the gases from the oil and injecting them into a gas chromatograph (GC). Detection of gas concentrations usually involves the use of a flame ionization detector (FID) and a thermal conductivity detector (TCD). Most systems also employ a methanizer, which converts any carbon monoxide and carbon dioxide present into methane so that it can be burned and detected on the FID, a very sensitive sensor.

=== "Rack" method ===
The original method, now ASTM D3612A, required that the oil be subjected to a high vacuum in an elaborate glass-sealed system to remove most of the gas from the oil. The gas was then collected and measured in a graduated tube by breaking the vacuum with a mercury piston. The gas was removed from the graduated column through a septum with a gas-tight syringe and immediately injected into a GC.

==== Multi Stage Gas Extractor ====
A Multi Stage Gas Extractor is a device for sampling transformer oil. During 2004, Central Power Research Institute, Bangalore, India introduced a novel method in which a same sample of transformer oil could be exposed to vacuum many times, at ambient temperature, until there is no increase in the volume of extracted gases. This method was further developed by Dakshin Lab Agencies, Bangalore to provide a Transformer Oil Multi Stage Gas Extractor. This method is an improvised version of ASTM D 3612A to do multiple extraction instead of single extraction and based on Toepler principle.

In this apparatus a fixed volume of sample oil is directly drawn from a sample tube into a degassing vessel under vacuum, where the gases are released. These gases are isolated using a mercury piston to measure its volume at atmospheric pressure and subsequent transfer to a gas chromatograph using a gas-tight syringe.

An apparatus, in very similar design and in principle providing a multiple gas extraction, using vacuum and Toepler pump has been in service in Sydney (Australia) for more than 30 years. The system is in use for power and instrument transformers, as well as cable oils.

=== Head space extraction ===
Head space extraction is explained in ASTM D 3612-C. The extraction of the gases is achieved by agitating and heating the oil to release the gases into a 'head space' of a sealed vial. Once the gases have been extracted they are then sent to the gas chromatograph.

Specialized techniques exist such as Headspace sorptive extraction (HSSE) or stir bar sorptive extraction (SBSE).

== Analysis ==
When gassing occurs in transformers there are several gases that are created. Enough useful information can be derived from nine gases so the additional gases are usually not examined. The nine gases examined are:

- Atmospheric gases: nitrogen and oxygen
- Oxides of carbon: carbon monoxide and carbon dioxide
- Hydrocarbons: acetylene, ethylene, methane, and ethane
- Hydrogen

The gases extracted from the sample oil are injected into a gas chromatograph where the columns separate gases. The gases are injected into the chromatograph and transported through a column. The column selectively retards the sample gases and they are identified as they travel past a detector at different times. A plot of detector signal versus time is called the chromatogram.

The separated gases are detected by thermal conductivity detector for atmospheric gases, by flame ionization detector for hydrocarbons and oxides of carbon. A methanator is used to detect oxides of carbon by reducing them to methane, when they are in very low concentration.

=== Types of faults ===
Thermal faults are detected by the presence of by-products of solid insulation decomposition. The solid insulation is commonly constructed of cellulose material. The solid insulation breaks down naturally but the rate increases as the temperature of the insulation increases. When an electrical fault occurs it releases energy which breaks the chemical bonds of the insulating fluid. Once the bonds are broken these elements quickly reform the fault gases. The energies and rates at which the gases are formed are different for each of the gases which allows the gas data to be examined to determine the kind of faulting activity taking place within the electrical equipment.

- Overheating windings typically lead to thermal decomposition of the cellulose insulation. In this case DGA results show high concentrations of carbon oxides (monoxide and dioxide). In extreme cases methane and ethylene are detected at higher levels.
- Oil overheating results in breakdown of liquid by heat and formation of methane, ethane and ethylene.
- Corona is a partial discharge and detected in a DGA by elevated hydrogen.
- Arcing is the most severe condition in a transformer and indicated by even low levels of acetylene.

=== Application ===
Interpretation of the results obtained for a particular transformer requires knowledge of the age of the unit, the loading cycle, and the date of major maintenance such as filtering of the oil. The IEC standard 60599 and the ANSI IEEE standard C57.104 give guidelines for the assessment of equipment condition based on the amount of gas present, and the ratios of the volumes of pairs of gases.

== Interpretation methods ==
Several methods have been developed to interpret DGA results and classify transformer faults:

=== Key Gas Method ===
The Key Gas Method identifies faults by analyzing the concentration of individual gases. Each gas serves as an indicator of a specific fault type: hydrogen indicates partial discharge, acetylene indicates arcing, and ethylene indicates thermal faults in oil.

=== Rogers Ratio Method ===
The Rogers Ratio Method evaluates ratios between selected gas concentrations rather than absolute values, making comparisons more consistent across different transformers. Three gas ratios are used to classify fault types, including thermal faults and electrical discharges.

=== Duval Triangle Method ===
The Duval Triangle Method plots three hydrocarbon gas percentages (methane, ethylene, acetylene) on a triangular diagram divided into fault zones. The position of the plotted point indicates the probable fault type.

=== Duval Pentagon Method ===
The Duval Pentagon Method extends the Triangle by incorporating five gases, providing improved diagnosis for stray gassing and cases where the Triangle method is inconclusive.

After samples have been taken and analyzed, the first step in evaluating DGA results is to consider the concentration levels (in ppm) of each key gas. Values for each of the key gases are recorded over time so that the rate-of-change of the various gas concentrations can be evaluated. Any sharp increase in key gas concentration is indicative of a potential problem within the transformer.

Dissolved gas analysis as a diagnostic technique has several limitations. It cannot precisely localize a fault. If the transformer has been refilled with fresh oil, results are not indicative of faults. Other limitations include:

- Gas ratio methods may produce inconclusive results when multiple faults occur simultaneously.
- Results can vary depending on transformer design, oil type, and operating history, requiring contextual interpretation.
- No single interpretation method is universally reliable; combining multiple methods improves diagnostic accuracy.

=== Manufacturers ===
- https://global.abb/group/en
- https://www.gevernova.com/
- https://www.siemens-energy.com/global/en/home.html
- https://www.mitsubishielectric.com/en/
- https://www.vaisala.com/en
- https://hertzinno.com/products/online-dga/online-dga-products/
