= Dielectric strength =

Degree of insulation

In physics, the term dielectric strength has the following meanings:

- for a pure electrically insulating material, the maximum electric field that the material can withstand under ideal conditions without undergoing electrical breakdown and becoming electrically conductive (i.e. without failure of its insulating properties).
- For a specific piece of dielectric material and location of electrodes, the minimum applied electric field (i.e. the applied voltage divided by electrode separation distance) that results in breakdown. This is the concept of breakdown voltage.

The theoretical dielectric strength of a material is an intrinsic property of the bulk material, and is independent of the configuration of the material or the electrodes with which the field is applied. This "intrinsic dielectric strength" corresponds to what would be measured using pure materials under ideal laboratory conditions. At breakdown, the electric field frees bound electrons. If the applied electric field is sufficiently high, free electrons from background radiation may be accelerated to velocities that can liberate additional electrons by collisions with neutral atoms or molecules, in a process known as avalanche breakdown. Breakdown occurs quite abruptly (typically in nanoseconds), resulting in the formation of an electrically conductive path and a disruptive discharge through the material. In a solid material, a breakdown event severely degrades, or even destroys, its insulating capability.

== Electrical breakdown ==
Electric current is a flow of electrically charged particles in a material caused by an electric field. The mobile charged particles responsible for electric current are called charge carriers. In different substances different particles serve as charge carriers: in metals and other solids some of the outer electrons of each atom (conduction electrons) are able to move about the material; in electrolytes and plasma it is ions, electrically charged atoms or molecules, and electrons. A substance that has a high concentration of charge carriers available for conduction will conduct a large current with the given electric field created by a given voltage applied across it, and thus has a low electrical resistivity; this is called an electrical conductor. A material that has few charge carriers will conduct very little current with a given electric field and has a high resistivity; this is called an electrical insulator.

However, when a large enough electric field is applied to any insulating substance, at a certain field strength the concentration of charge carriers in the material suddenly increases by many orders of magnitude, so its resistance drops and it becomes a conductor. This is called electrical breakdown. The physical mechanism causing breakdown differs in different substances. In a solid, it usually occurs when the electric field becomes strong enough to pull outer valence electrons away from their atoms, so they become mobile. The field strength at which break down occurs is an intrinsic property of the material called its dielectric strength.

In practical electric circuits electrical breakdown is often an unwanted occurrence, a failure of insulating material causing a short circuit, resulting in a catastrophic failure of the equipment. The sudden drop in resistance causes a high current to flow through the material, and the sudden extreme Joule heating may cause the material or other parts of the circuit to melt or vaporize explosively. However, breakdown itself is reversible. If the current supplied by the external circuit is sufficiently limited, no damage is done to the material, and reducing the applied voltage causes a transition back to the material's insulating state.

== Factors affecting apparent dielectric strength ==
- It may vary with sample thickness. (see "defects" below)
- It may vary with operating temperature.
- It may vary with frequency.
- For gases (e.g. nitrogen, sulfur hexafluoride) it normally decreases with increased humidity as ions in water can provide conductive channels.
- For gases it increases with pressure according to Paschen's law
- For air, dielectric strength increases slightly as the absolute humidity increases but decreases with an increase in relative humidity

== Break down field strength ==
The field strength at which break down occurs depends on the respective geometries of the dielectric (insulator) and the electrodes with which the electric field is applied, as well as the rate of increase of the applied electric field. Because dielectric materials usually contain minute defects, the practical dielectric strength will be a significantly less than the intrinsic dielectric strength of an ideal, defect-free, material. Dielectric films tend to exhibit greater dielectric strength than thicker samples of the same material. For instance, the dielectric strength of silicon dioxide films of thickness around 1 μm is about 0.5 GV/m. However very thin layers (below, say, 100 nm) become partially conductive because of electron tunneling. Multiple layers of thin dielectric films are used where maximum practical dielectric strength is required, such as high-voltage capacitors and pulse transformers. Since the dielectric strength of gases varies depending on the shape and configuration of the electrodes, it is usually measured as a fraction of the dielectric strength of nitrogen gas.

Dielectric strength (in MV/m, or 10^{6} V/m) of various common materials:

Substance	Dielectric strength (MV/m or V/μm)
Helium (relative to nitrogen)	0.15
Air	3
Sulfur hexafluoride	8.5–9.8
Alumina	13.4
Window glass	9.8–13.8
Borosilicate glass	20–40
Silicone oil, mineral oil	10–15
Benzene	163
Polystyrene	19.7
Polyethylene	19–160
Neoprene rubber	15.7–26.7
Distilled water	65–70
Beryllium oxide	27–31
High vacuum (200 μPa) (limited by field emission)	20–40 (depends on electrode shape)
Fused silica	470–670
Waxed paper	40–60
PTFE (Teflon, extruded)	19.7
PTFE (Teflon, insulating film)	60–173
PEEK (Polyether ether ketone)	23
Mica	118
Diamond	2,000
PZT	10–25
Perfect vacuum	10^{12}

== Units ==
In SI, the unit of dielectric strength is volts per meter (V/m). It is also common to see related units such as volt per centimeter (V/cm), megavolts per meter (MV/m), and so on.

In United States customary units, dielectric strength is often specified in volt per mil (a mil is 1/1000 inch). The conversion is:

$$\begin{align}
1 \text{ V/mil} &= 3.94\times 10^{4} \text{ V/m} \\
1 \text{ V/m} &= 2.54\times 10^{-5} \text{ V/mil}
\end{align}$$

== See also ==
- Breakdown voltage
- Relative permittivity
- Rotational Brownian motion
- Paschen's law - variation of dielectric strength of gas related to pressure
- Electrical treeing
- Lichtenberg figure
