= Sprite (lightning) =

Electrical discharges above thunderstorm clouds

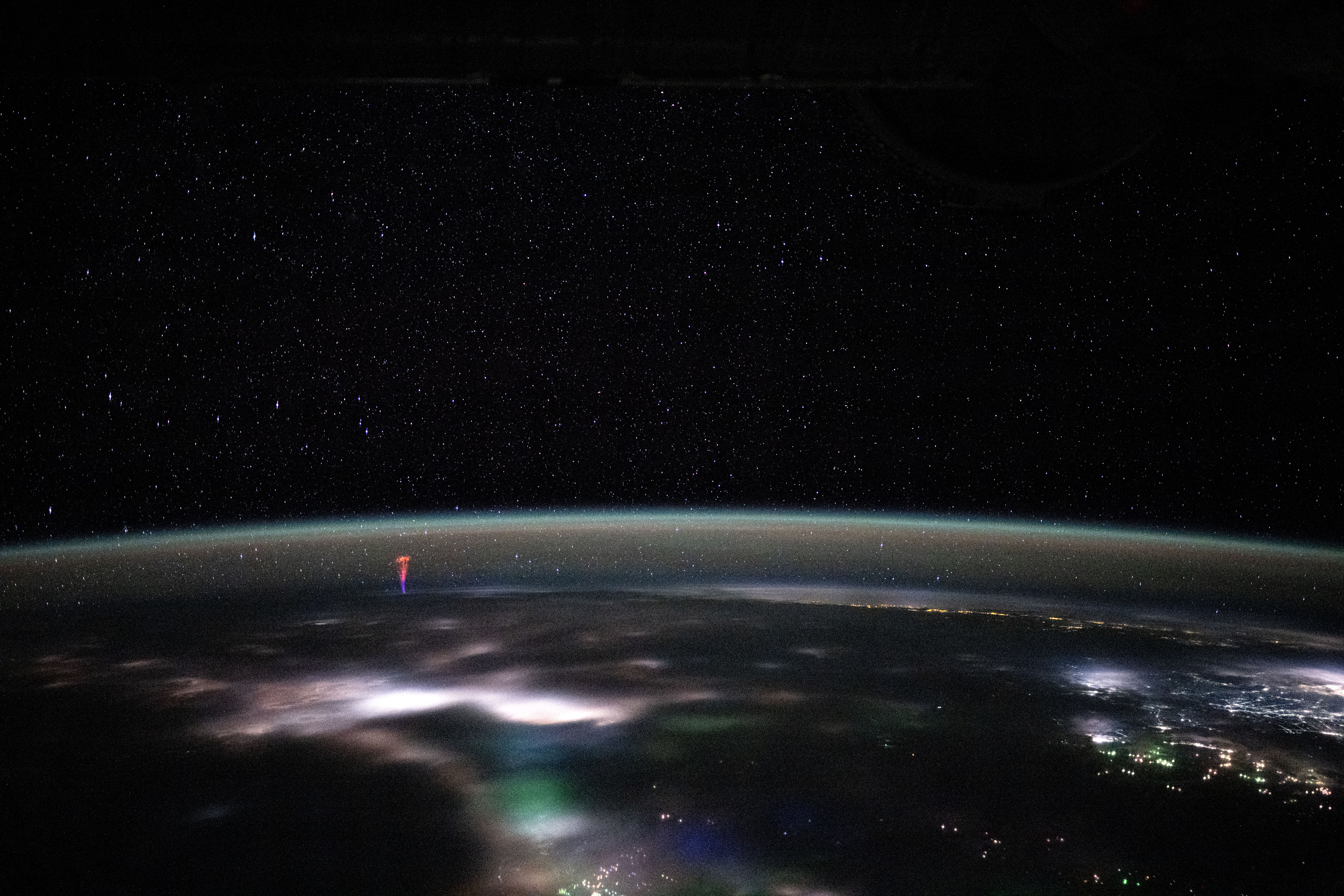
A sprite over Southeast Asia as seen from space

Sprites or red sprites are large-scale electric discharges that occur in the mesosphere, high above thunderstorm clouds, or cumulonimbus, giving rise to a varied range of visual shapes flickering in the night sky. They are usually triggered by the discharges of positive lightning between an underlying thundercloud and the ground.

== Summary ==
Sprites appear as luminous red-orange flashes. They often occur in clusters above the troposphere at an altitude range of 50–90 km (31–56 mi). Sporadic visual reports of sprites go back at least to 1886. They were first photographed on July 4, 1989, by scientists from the University of Minnesota and have subsequently been captured in video recordings thousands of times.

Sprites are sometimes inaccurately called upper-atmospheric lightning. However, they are cold plasma phenomena that lack the hot channel temperatures of tropospheric lightning, so they are more akin to fluorescent tube discharges than to lightning discharges. Sprites are associated with various other upper-atmospheric optical phenomena including blue jets and ELVES.

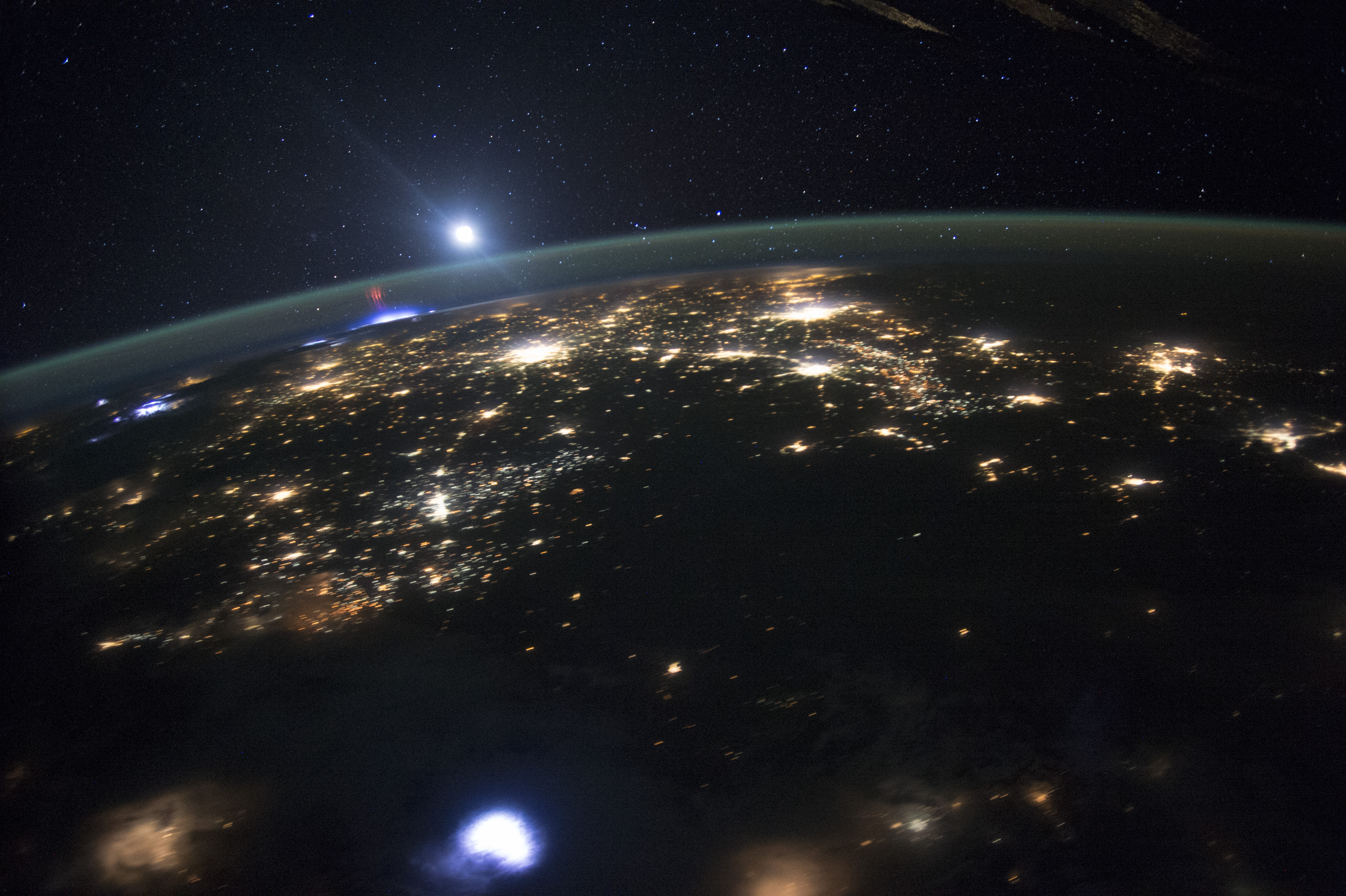
A sprite at the horizon, with lightning below in the troposphere and above the green line of airglow at the upper mesopause and border to space (the bright light above is the Moon)

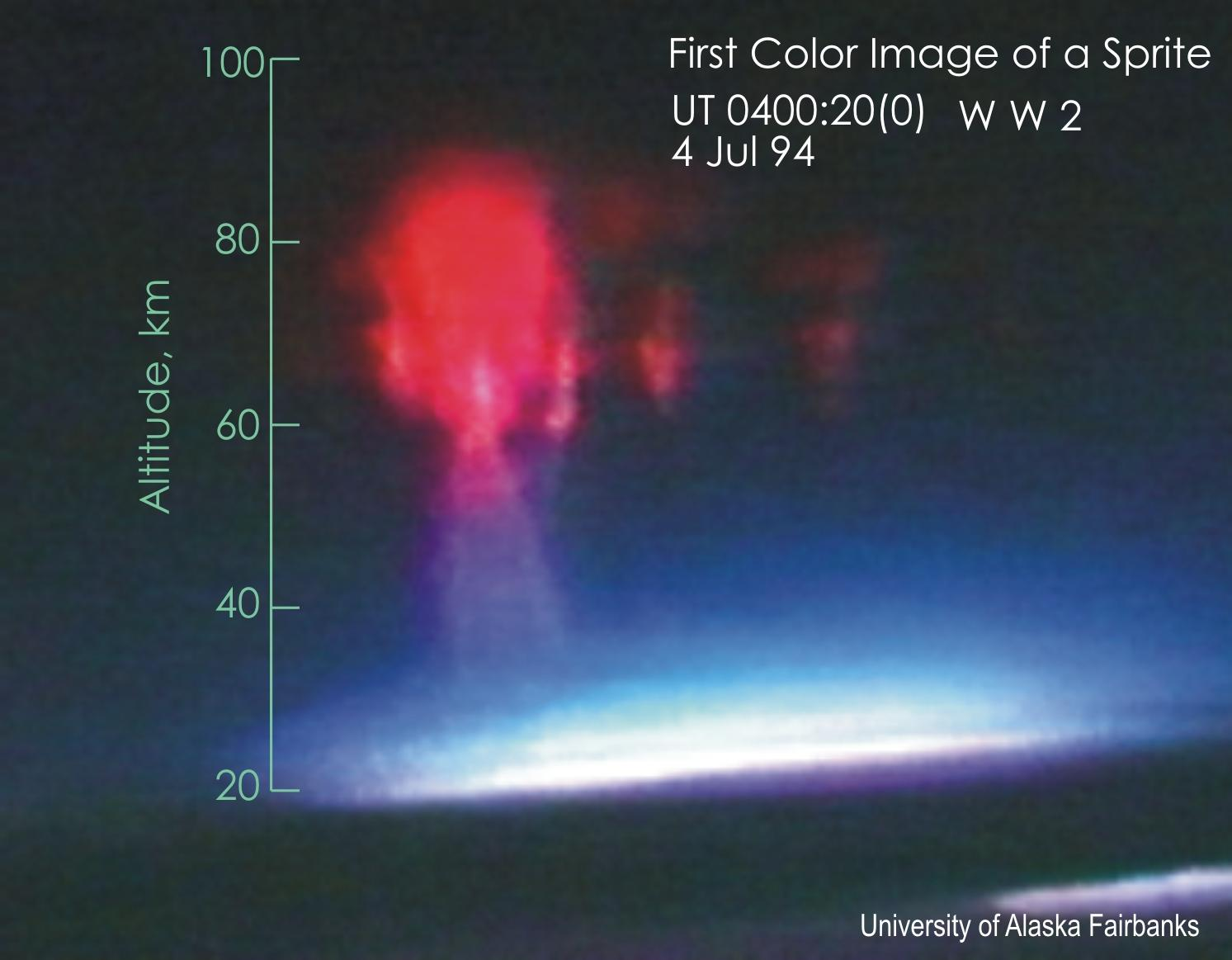
First color image of a sprite, taken from an aircraft

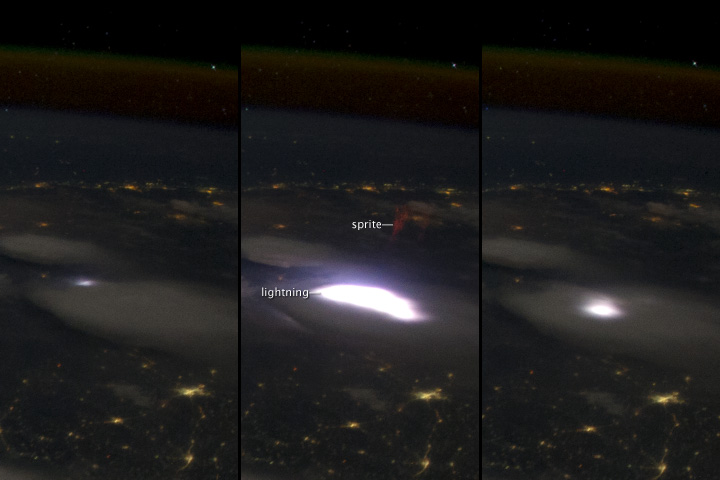
A sprite over Laos, as seen from the International Space Station

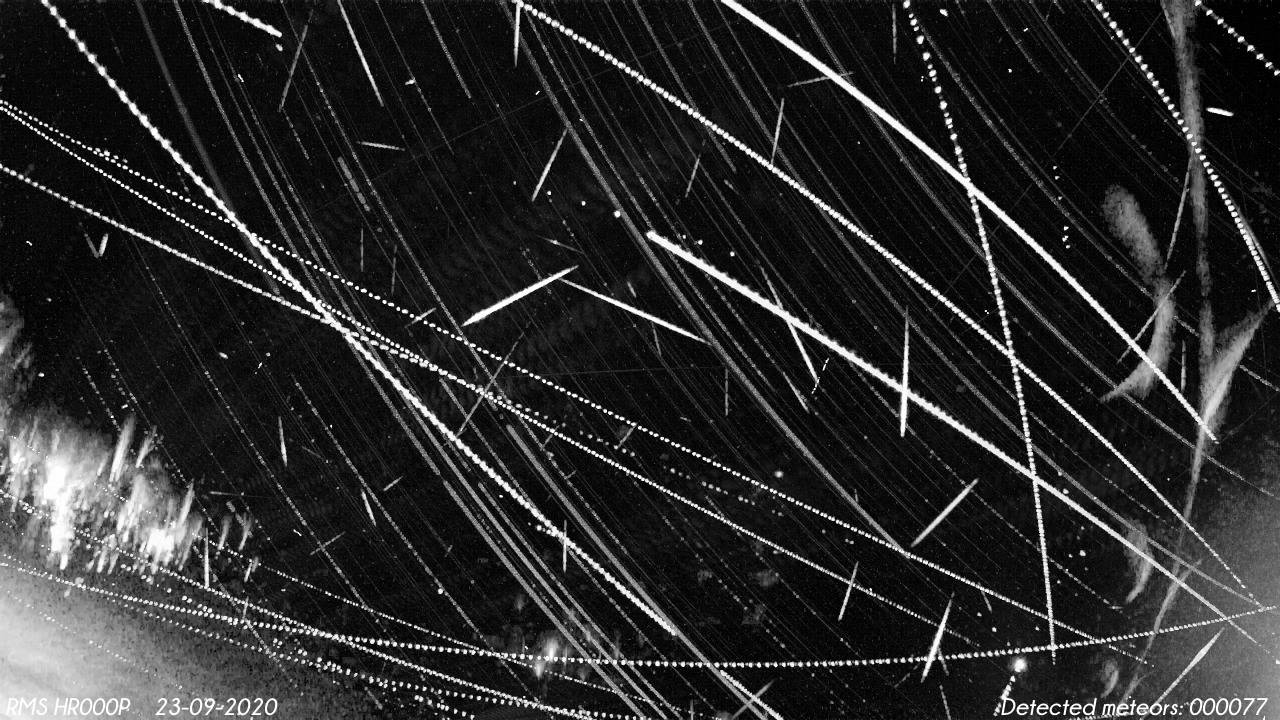
Sprites over the Alps, close to Triglav, depicted in stack of images from Global meteor network camera HR000P (2020-09-23)

== History ==
The earliest known report is by Toynbee and Mackenzie in 1886. Nobel laureate C. T. R. Wilson had suggested in 1925, on theoretical grounds, that electrical breakdown could occur in the upper atmosphere, and in 1956 he witnessed what possibly could have been a sprite. They were first documented photographically on July 6, 1989, when scientists from the University of Minnesota, using a low-light video camera, accidentally captured the first image of what would subsequently become known as a sprite.

Several years after their discovery they were named "sprites" (air spirits) after their namesake mythological entity based on their elusive nature. Since the 1989 video capture, images of sprites have been made from the ground, from aircraft, and from space, and have become the subject of intensive investigations. A high-speed video captured by Thomas Ashcraft, Jacob L Harley, Matthew G McHarg, and Hans Nielsen in 2019 at about 100,000 frames per second provided some observations on how sprites develop. However, according to the NASA APOD blog, despite being recorded in photographs and videos for more than 30 years, the "root cause" of sprite lightning remains unknown, "apart from a general association with positive cloud-to-ground lightning". NASA also notes that not all storms exhibit sprite lightning.

In 2016, sprites were observed during Hurricane Matthew's passage through the Caribbean. The role of sprites in the tropical cyclones is presently unknown.

Since 2022 NASA operates a citizen science website and database called Spritacular collecting and studying images of sprites by citizens.

== Characteristics ==
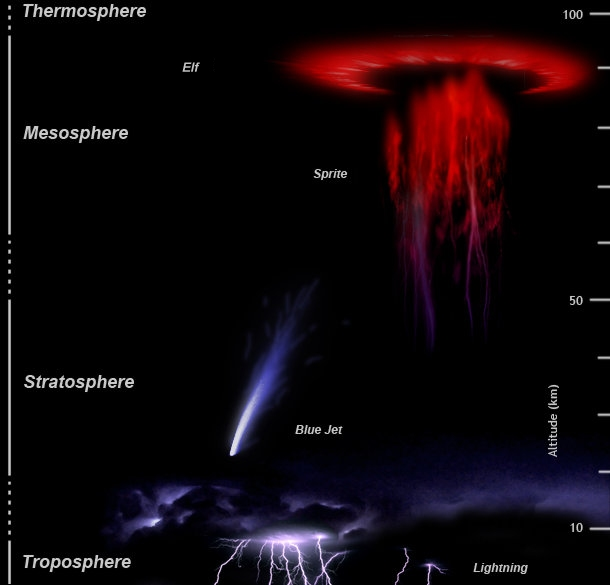
Different types of electrical phenomena in the atmosphere

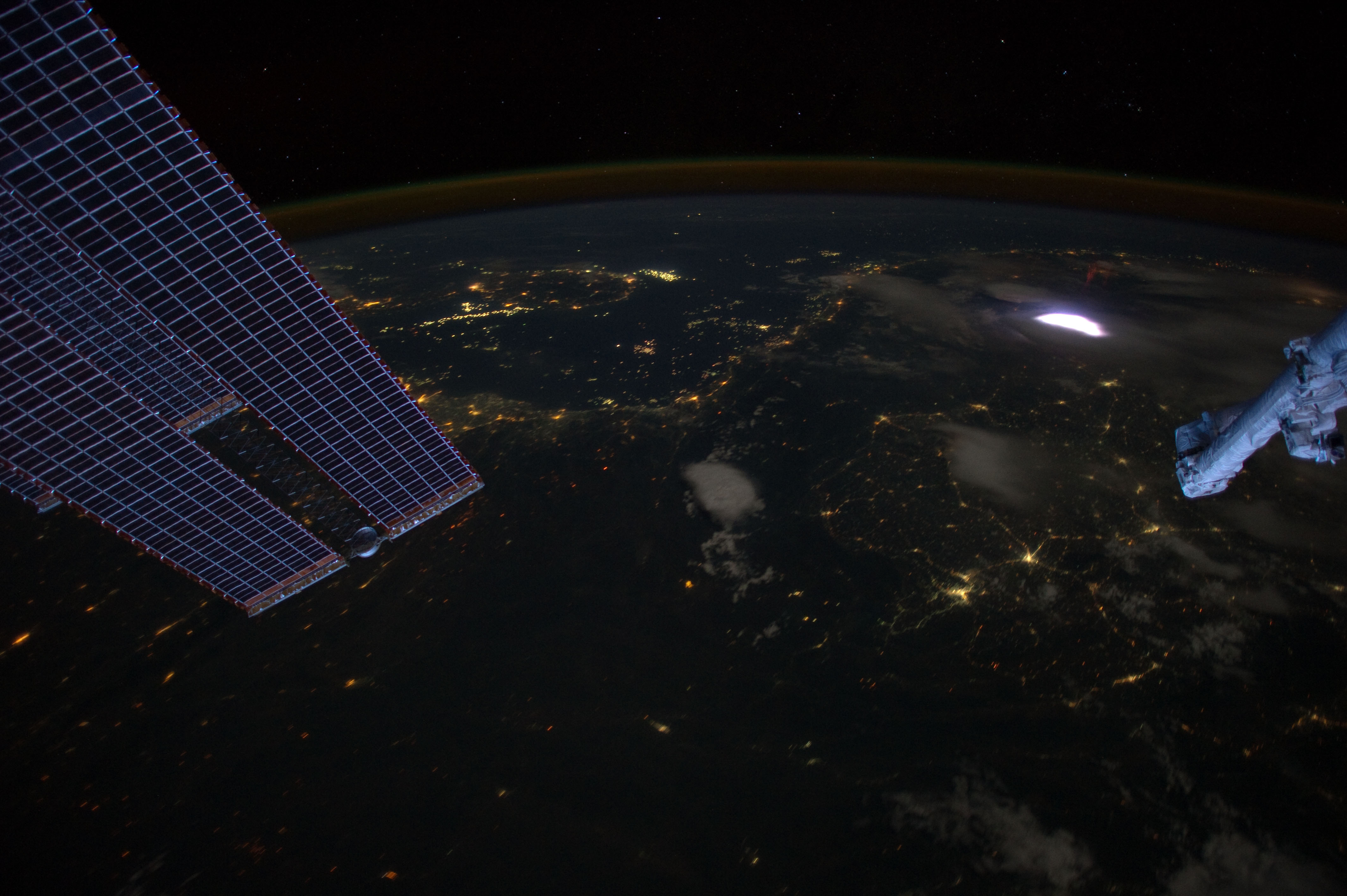
A sprite seen from the International Space Station (top right, faint red above the lightning)

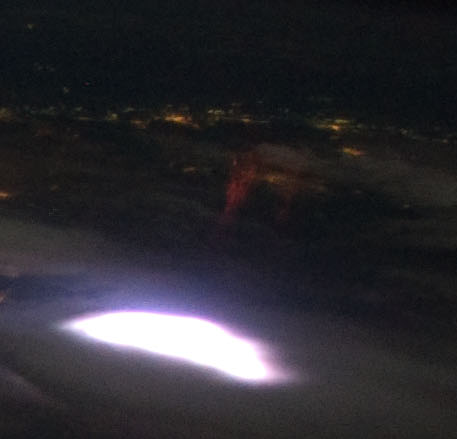
ISS sprite image above; zoomed in

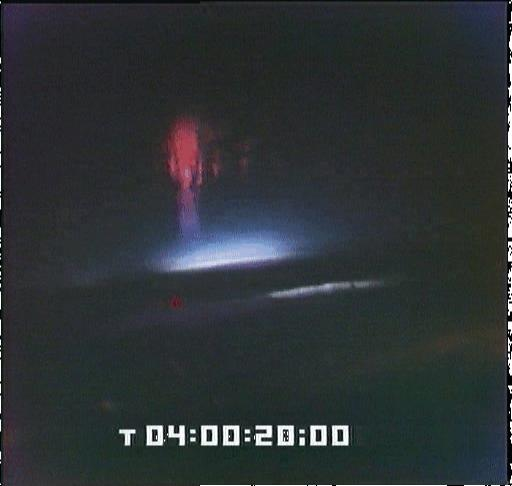
Another shot from the first color clip of the sprite

Sprites have been observed over North America, Central America, South America, Europe, Central Africa (Zaire), Australia, the Sea of Japan, and Asia and are believed to occur during most large thunderstorm systems.

Rodger (1999) categorized three types of sprites based on their visual appearance.

- Jellyfish sprite – very large, up to 50 by 50 km (31 by 31 mi)
- Column sprite (C-sprite) – large-scale electrical discharges above the earth that are still not totally understood
- Carrot sprite – a column sprite with long tendrils

Sprites are colored reddish-orange in their upper regions, with bluish hanging tendrils below, and may be preceded by a reddish halo. They last longer than normal lower stratospheric discharges, which last typically a few milliseconds, and are usually triggered by the discharges of positive lightning between the thundercloud and the ground, although sprites generated by negative ground flashes have also been observed. They often occur in clusters of two or more, and typically span the altitude range 50 to 90 kilometres (31 to 56 mi), with what appear to be tendrils hanging below, and branches reaching above.

Optical imaging using a 10,000 frame-per-second high speed camera showed that sprites are clusters of small, decameter scale, (10–100 m or 33–328 ft) balls of ionization that are launched at an altitude of about 80 km (50 mi) and then move downward at speeds of up to ten percent the speed of light, followed a few milliseconds later by a separate set of upward moving balls of ionization. Sprites may be horizontally displaced by up to 50 km (31 mi) from the location of the underlying lightning strike, with a time delay following the lightning that is typically a few milliseconds, but on rare occasions may be up to 100 milliseconds.

This footage from the ISS shows a red sprite over East Asia immediately before 0:07, directly above the large lightning flash toward the upper right of the frame.

In order to film sprites from Earth, special conditions must be present: 150–500 km (93–311 mi) of clear view to a powerful thunderstorm with positive lightning between cloud and ground, red-sensitive recording equipment, and an unlit black sky.

== Mechanism ==
Sprites occur near the top of the mesosphere at about 80 km altitude in response to the electric field generated by lightning flashes in underlying thunderstorms. When a sufficiently large positive lightning strike carries charges to the ground, the cloud top is left with a strongly negative net charge. This may be modeled as a quasi-static electric dipole and for less than 10 milliseconds a strong electric field is generated in the region above the thunderstorm. In the low pressure of the upper mesosphere the breakdown voltage is drastically reduced, allowing for an electron avalanche to occur. Sprites get their characteristic red color from excitation of nitrogen in the low pressure environment of the upper mesosphere. At such low pressures quenching by atomic oxygen is much faster than that of nitrogen, allowing for nitrogen emissions to dominate, despite no difference in composition.

== Sprite halo ==
Sometimes sprites are preceded, by approximately 1 millisecond, by a sprite halo, a pancake-shaped region of weak, transient optical emissions approximately 50 kilometres (31 mi) across and 10 kilometres (6.2 mi) thick. The halo is centered at approximately 70 kilometres (43 mi) altitude above the initiating lightning strike. These halos are thought to be produced by the same physical process that produces sprites, but for which the ionization is too weak to cross the threshold required for streamer formation. They may be mistaken for ELVES, due to their visual similarity and short duration.

Research carried out at Stanford University in 2000 indicates that, unlike sprites with bright vertical columnar structure, occurrence of sprite halos is not unusual in association with normal (negative) lightning discharges. Research in 2004 by scientists from Tohoku University found that very low frequency emissions occur at the same time as the sprite, indicating that a discharge within the cloud may generate the sprites.

== Related aircraft damage ==
Sprites have been blamed for otherwise unexplained incidents involving high altitude vehicular operations above thunderstorms. One example of this is the malfunction of a NASA stratospheric balloon launched on June 6, 1989, from Palestine, Texas. The balloon suffered an uncommanded payload release while flying at 120,000 feet (37,000 m) above a thunderstorm near Graham, Texas. Months after the incident, an investigation concluded that a "bolt of lightning" traveling upward from the clouds provoked the incident. The attribution of the incident to a sprite was made retroactively, since this term was not coined until late 1993.

== See also ==
- Upper-atmospheric lightning (includes blue jets)
- Aurora (astronomy)
- Catatumbo lightning
- Cosmic ray visual phenomena
