= Ozone–oxygen cycle =

Biogeochemical cycle

Ozone–oxygen cycle in the ozone layer: 1. Oxygen photolyzed to atomic oxygen 2. Oxygen and ozone continuously interconverted. Solar UV breaks down oxygen; molecular and atomic oxygen combine to form Ozone. 3. Ozone is lost by reaction with atomic oxygen (plus other trace atoms).

The ozone–oxygen cycle is the process by which ozone is continually regenerated in Earth's stratosphere, converting ultraviolet radiation (UV) into heat. In 1930 Sydney Chapman resolved the chemistry involved. The process is commonly called the Chapman cycle by atmospheric scientists.

Most of the ozone production occurs in the tropical upper stratosphere and mesosphere. The total mass of ozone produced per day over the globe is about 400 million metric tons. The global mass of ozone is relatively constant at about 3 billion metric tons, meaning the Sun produces about 12% of the ozone layer each day.

== Photochemistry ==
The Chapman cycle describes the main reactions that naturally determine, to first approximation, the concentration of ozone in the stratosphere. It includes four processes - and a fifth, less important one - all involving oxygen atoms and molecules, and UV radiation:

=== Creation ===
An oxygen molecule is split (photolyzed) by higher frequency UV light (top end of UV-B, UV-C and above) into two oxygen atoms (see figure):

1. oxygen photodissociation: O_{2} + ℎν_{(<242 nm)} → 2 O

Each oxygen atom may then combine with an oxygen molecule to form an ozone molecule:

2. ozone creation: O + O_{2} + A → O_{3} + A
where A denotes an additional molecule or atom, such as N_{2} or O_{2}, required to maintain the conservation of energy and momentum in the reaction. Any excess energy is produced as kinetic energy.

=== The ozone–oxygen cycle ===
The ozone molecules formed by the reaction (above) absorb radiation with an appropriate wavelength between UV-C and UV-B. The triatomic ozone molecule becomes diatomic molecular oxygen, plus a free oxygen atom (see figure):

3. ozone photodissociation: O_{3} + ℎν_{(240–310 nm)} → O_{2}+ O

The atomic oxygen produced may react with another oxygen molecule to reform ozone via the ozone creation reaction (reaction 2 above).

These two reactions thus form the ozone–oxygen cycle, wherein the chemical energy released by ozone creation becomes molecular kinetic energy. The net result of the cycle is the conversion of penetrating UV-B light into heat, without any net loss of ozone. While keeping the ozone layer in stable balance, and protecting the lower atmosphere from harmful UV radiation, the cycle also provides one of two major heat sources in the stratosphere (the other being kinetic energy, released when O_{2} is photolyzed into individual O atoms).

=== Removal ===
If an oxygen atom and an ozone molecule meet, they recombine to form two oxygen molecules:

4. ozone conversion: O_{3} + O → 2 O_{2}

Two oxygen atoms may react to form one oxygen molecule:

5. oxygen recombination: 2O + A → O_{2} + A
as in reaction 2 (above), A denotes another molecule or atom, like N_{2} or O_{2} required for the conservation of energy and momentum.

Note that reaction 5 is of the least importance in the stratosphere, since, under normal conditions, the concentration of oxygen atoms is much lower than that of diatomic oxygen molecules. This reaction is therefore less common than ozone creation (reaction 2).

The overall amount of ozone in the stratosphere is determined by the balance between production from solar radiation and its removal. The removal rate is slow, since the concentration of free O atoms is very low.

=== Additional reactions ===
In addition to these five reactions, certain free radicals - the most important being hydroxyl (OH), nitric oxide (NO), and atomic chlorine (Cl) and bromine (Br) - catalyze the recombination reaction, leading to an ozone layer that is thinner than it would be if the catalysts were not present.

Most OH and NO are naturally present in the stratosphere, but human activity - especially emissions of chlorofluorocarbons (CFCs) and halons - has greatly increased the concentration of Cl and Br, leading to ozone depletion. Each Cl or Br atom can catalyze tens of thousands of decomposition reactions before it is removed from the stratosphere.

== Main reactions in different atmospheric layers ==
=== Thermosphere ===
For given relative reactants concentrations, The rates of ozone creation and oxygen recombination (reactions 2 and 5) are proportional to the air density cubed, while the rate of ozone conversion (reaction 4) is proportional to the air density squared, and the photodissociation reactions (reactions 1 and 3) have a linear dependence on air density. Thus, at the upper thermosphere, where air density is very low and photon flux is high, oxygen photodissociation is fast while ozone creation is low, thus its concentration is low. Thus the most important reactions are oxygen photodissociation and oxygen recombination, with most of the oxygen molecules dissociated to oxygen atoms.

As we go to the lower thermosphere (e.g. 100 km height and below), the photon flux in the <170 nm wavelengths drops sharply due to absorption by oxygen in the oxygen photodissociation reaction (reaction 1). This wavelength regime has the highest cross section for this reaction (10^{−17} cm^{2} per oxygen molecule), and thus the rate of oxygen photodissociation per oxygen molecule decreases significantly at these altitudes, from more than 10^{−7} per second (about once a month) at 100 km to 10^{−8} per second (about once every few years) at 80 km . As a result, the atomic oxygen concentration (both relative and absolute) decreases sharply, and ozone creation (reaction 2) is ongoing, leading to a small but non-negligible ozone presence.

Note that temperatures also drop as altitude decreases, because lower photon photodissociation rates mean lower heat production per air molecule.

=== Below thermosphere: Reaction rates at steady state ===
Odd oxygen species (atomic oxygen and ozone) have net creation rate only by oxygen dissociation (reaction 1), and net destruction by either ozone conversion or oxygen recombination (reactions 4 and 5). At steady state these processes are balanced, so the rates of these reactions obey:

(rate of reaction 1) = (rate of reaction 4) + (rate of reaction 5).

At steady state, ozone creation is also balanced with its removal. so:

(rate of reaction 2) = (rate of reaction 3) + (rate of reaction 4).

It thus follows that:

(rate of reaction 2) + (rate of reaction 5) = (rate of reaction 3) + (rate of reaction 1).

The right-hand side is the total photodissociation rate, of either oxygen or ozone.

Below the thermosphere, the atomic oxygen concentration is very low compared to molecular oxygen. Therefore, oxygen atoms are much more likely to hit oxygen (diatomic) molecules than to hit other oxygen atoms, making oxygen recombination (reaction 5) far rarer than ozone creation (reaction 2). Following the steady-state relation between the reaction rates, we may therefore approximate:

(rate of reaction 2) = (rate of reaction 3) + (rate of reaction 1)

=== Mesosphere ===
In the mesosphere, oxygen photodissociation dominates over ozone photodissociation, so we have approximately:

(rate of reaction 2) = (rate of reaction 1) = (rate of reaction 4)

Thus, ozone is mainly removed by ozone conversion. Both ozone creation and conversion depend linearly on oxygen atom concentration, but in ozone creation an oxygen atom must encounter an oxygen molecule and another air molecule (typically nitrogen) simultaneously, while in ozone conversion an oxygen atom must only encounter an ozone molecule. Thus, when both reactions are balanced, the ratio between ozone and molecular oxygen concentrations is approximately proportional to air density.

Therefore, the relative ozone concentration is higher at lower altitudes, where air density is higher. This trend continues to some extent lower into the stratosphere, and thus as we go from 60 km to 30 km altitude, both air density and ozone relative concentration increase by ~40-50-fold.

=== Stratosphere ===
Absorption by oxygen in the mesosphere and thermosphere (in the oxygen photodissociation reaction) reduces photon flux at wavelengths below 200 nanometer, where oxygen photodissociation is dominated by Schumann–Runge bands and continuum, with cross-section of up to 10^{−17} cm^{2}. Due to this absorption, photon flux in these wavelengths is so low in the stratosphere, that oxygen photodissociation becomes dominated by the Hertzberg band of the 200-240 nm photon wavelength, even though the cross-section of this process is as low as 10^{−24} - 10^{−23} cm^{2}. The ozone photodissociation rate per ozone molecule has a cross-section 6 orders of magnitude higher in the 220-300 nm wavelength range. With ozone concentrations in the order of 10^{−6}-10^{−5} relative to molecular oxygen, ozone photodissociation becomes the dominant photodissociation reaction, and most of the stratosphere heat is generated through this process, with highest heat generation rate per molecule at the upper limit of the stratosphere (stratopause), where ozone concentration is already relatively high while UV flux is still high as well in those wavelengths, before being depleted by this same photodissociation process.

In addition to ozone photodissociation becoming a more dominant removal reaction, catalytic ozone destruction due to free radicals (mainly atomic hydrogen, hydroxyl, nitric oxide, chlorine and bromide) increases the effective ozone conversion reaction rate. Both processes act to increase ozone removal, leading to a more moderate increase of ozone relative concentration as altitude decreases, even though air density continues to increase.

Due to both ozone and oxygen growing density as we go to lower altitudes, UV photon flux at wavelengths below 300 nm decreases substantially, and oxygen photodissociation rates fall below 10^{−9} per second per molecule at 30 km. With decreasing oxygen photodissociation rates, odd-oxygen species (atomic oxygen and ozone molecules) are hardly formed de novo (rather than being transmuted to each other by the other reactions), and most atomic oxygen needed for ozone creation is derived almost exclusively from ozone removal by ozone photodissociation. Thus, ozone becomes depleted as we go below 30 km altitude and reaches very low concentrations at the tropopause.

=== Troposphere ===
In the troposphere, ozone formation and destruction are no longer controlled by the ozone-oxygen cycle. Rather, tropospheric ozone chemistry is dominated today by industrial pollutants other gases of volcanic source.
