= Stratosphere =

Layer of the atmosphere above the troposphere

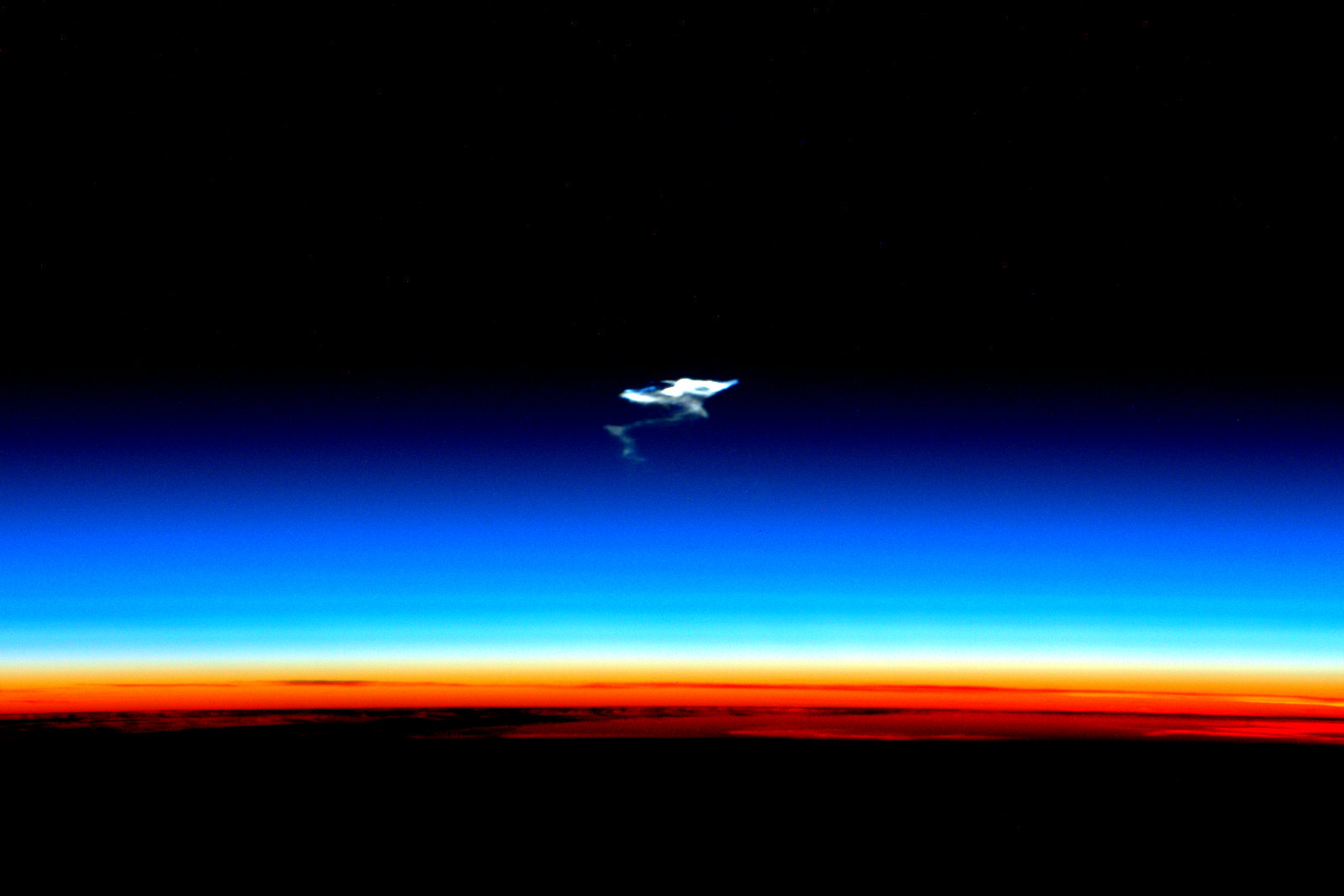
Afterglow of the troposphere (orange), the stratosphere (blue) and the mesosphere (dark), at which atmospheric entry of objects begins, as in this case of a spacecraft reentry that leaves contrails.

Earth's five primary atmospheric layers: exosphere, thermosphere, mesosphere, stratosphere, and troposphere (not to scale).

The stratosphere is the second-lowest layer of Earth's atmosphere, located above the troposphere and below the mesosphere. Pronounced /ˈstrætəˌsfɪər, -toʊ-/, the name originates from Ancient Greek στρωτός (strōtós) 'layer, stratum' and -sphere. The stratosphere is composed of stratified temperature zones, with the warmer layers of air located higher (closer to outer space) and the cooler layers lower (closer to the planetary surface of the Earth). The increase of temperature with altitude is a result of the absorption of the Sun's ultraviolet (UV) radiation by the ozone layer, where ozone is exothermically photolyzed into oxygen in a cyclical fashion. This temperature inversion is in contrast to the troposphere, where temperature decreases with altitude, and between the troposphere and stratosphere is the tropopause border that demarcates the beginning of the temperature inversion.

Near the equator, the lower edge of the stratosphere is as high as 20 km (66,000 ft; 12 mi), at mid-latitudes around 10 km (33,000 ft; 6.2 mi), and at the poles about 7 km (23,000 ft; 4.3 mi). Temperatures range from an average of −51 °C (−60 °F; 220 K) near the tropopause to an average of −15 °C (5.0 °F; 260 K) near the mesosphere. Stratospheric temperatures also vary within the stratosphere as the seasons change, reaching particularly low temperatures in the polar night (winter). Winds in the stratosphere can far exceed those in the troposphere, reaching near 60 m/s (220 km/h; 130 mph) in the Southern polar vortex.

== Discovery ==
In 1902, Léon Teisserenc de Bort from France and Richard Assmann from Germany, in separate but coordinated publications and following years of observations, published the discovery of an isothermal layer at around 11–14 km (6.8–8.7 mi), which is the base of the lower stratosphere. This was based on temperature profiles from mostly unmanned and a few manned instrumented balloons.

== Ozone layer ==
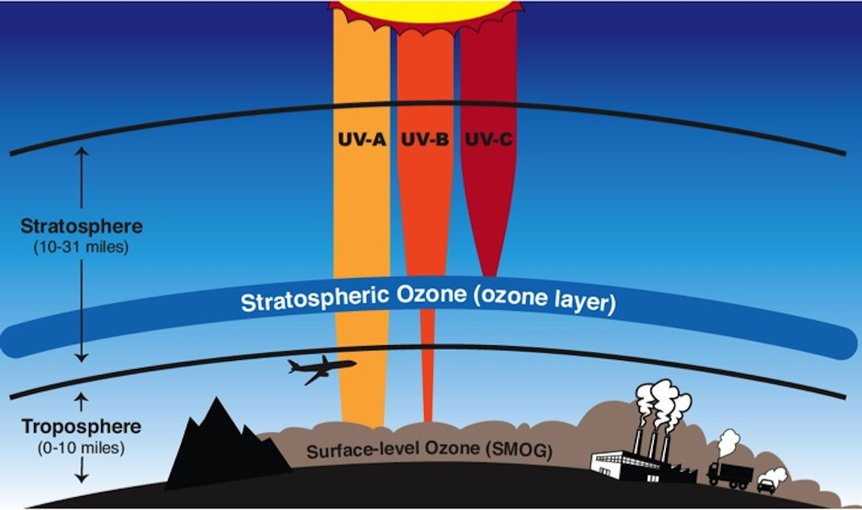
The ozone layer in the stratosphere blocks harmful UV radiation from reaching the surface of the Earth. A gamma-ray burst would deplete the ozone layer, allowing UV radiation through.

The mechanism describing the formation of the ozone layer was described by British mathematician and geophysicist Sydney Chapman in 1930, and is known as the Chapman cycle or ozone–oxygen cycle. Molecular oxygen absorbs high energy sunlight in the UV-C region, at wavelengths shorter than about 240 nm. Radicals produced from the homolytically split oxygen molecules combine with molecular oxygen to form ozone. Ozone in turn is photolyzed much more rapidly than molecular oxygen as it has a stronger absorption that occurs at longer wavelengths, where the solar emission is more intense. Ozone (O_{3}) photolysis produces O and O_{2}. The oxygen atom product combines with atmospheric molecular oxygen to reform O_{3}, releasing heat. The rapid photolysis and reformation of ozone heat the stratosphere, resulting in a temperature inversion. This increase of temperature with altitude is characteristic of the stratosphere; its resistance to vertical mixing means that it is stratified. Within the stratosphere temperatures increase with altitude (see temperature inversion); the top of the stratosphere has a temperature of about 270 K (−3 °C; 26 °F).

This vertical stratification, with warmer layers above and cooler layers below, makes the stratosphere dynamically stable: there is no regular convection and associated turbulence in this part of the atmosphere. However, exceptionally energetic convection processes, such as volcanic eruption columns and overshooting tops in severe supercell thunderstorms, may carry convection into the stratosphere on a very local and temporary basis. Overall, the attenuation of solar UV at wavelengths that damage DNA by the ozone layer allows life to exist on the planet's surface outside of the ocean. All air entering the stratosphere must pass through the tropopause, the temperature minimum that divides the troposphere and stratosphere. The rising air is literally freeze-dried; the stratosphere is a very dry place. The top of the stratosphere is called the stratopause, above which the temperature decreases with height.

=== Formation and destruction ===
Paul J. Crutzen, Mario J. Molina and F. Sherwood Rowland were awarded the Nobel Prize in Chemistry in 1995 for their work describing the formation and decomposition of stratospheric ozone.

== Aircraft flight ==
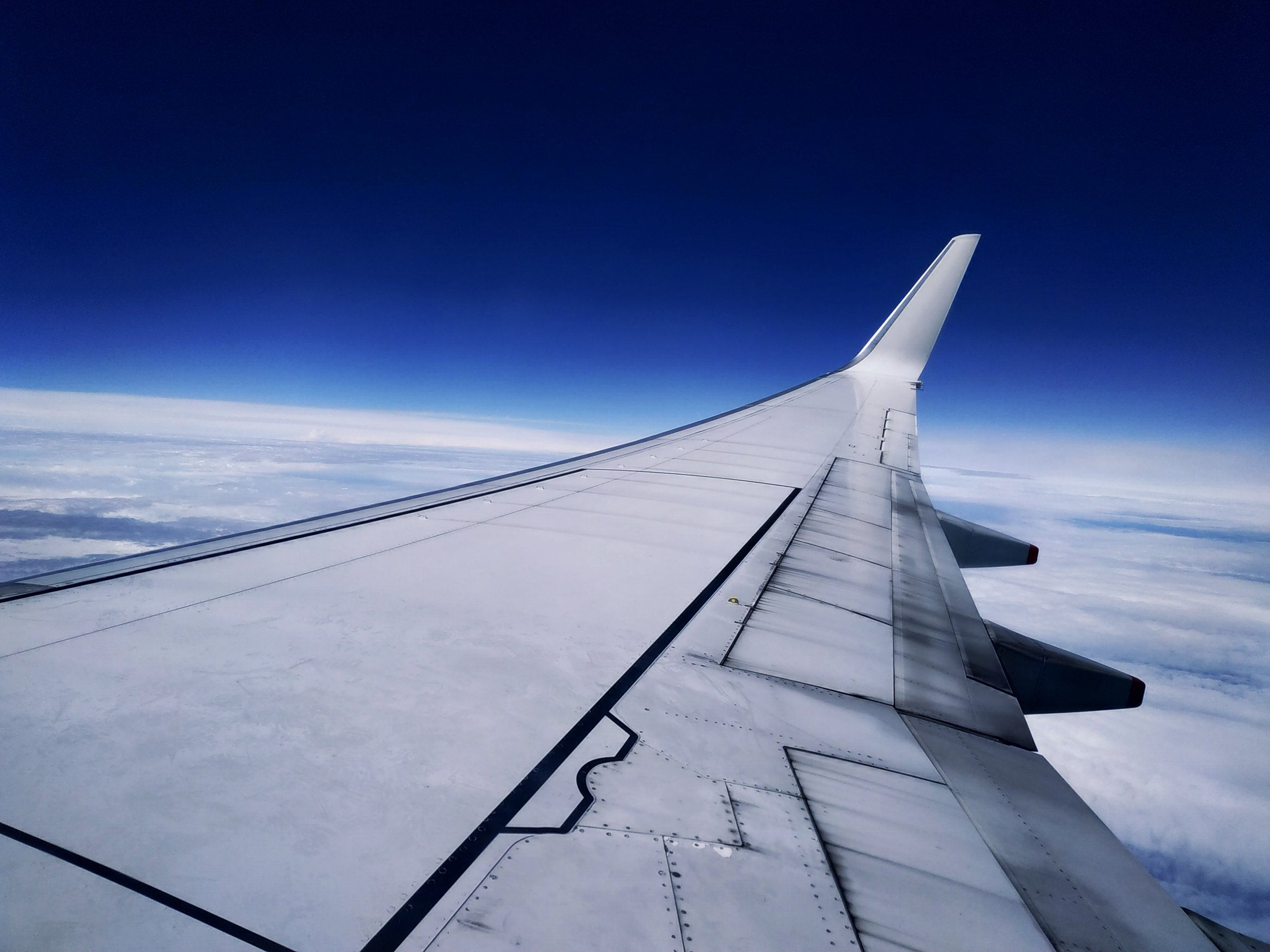
Aircraft typically cruise at the stratosphere to avoid turbulence rampant in the troposphere. The blue beam in this image is the ozone layer, beaming further to the mesosphere. The ozone heats the stratosphere, making conditions stable. The stratosphere is also the altitude limit of jets and weather balloons, as air is roughly a thousand times thinner there than at the troposphere.

Commercial airliners typically cruise at altitudes of 9–12 km (30,000–39,000 ft) which is in the lower reaches of the stratosphere in temperate latitudes. This optimizes fuel efficiency, mostly due to the low temperatures encountered near the tropopause and low air density, reducing parasitic drag on the airframe. Stated another way, it allows the airliner to fly faster while maintaining lift equal to the weight of the plane. (The fuel consumption depends on the drag, which is related to the lift by the lift-to-drag ratio.) It also allows the airplane to stay above the turbulent weather of the troposphere.

The Concorde aircraft cruised at Mach 2 at about 60,000 ft (18 km), and the SR-71 cruised at Mach 3 at 85,000 ft (26 km), all within the stratosphere.

Because the temperature in the tropopause and lower stratosphere is largely constant with increasing altitude, very little convection and its resultant turbulence occurs there. Most turbulence at this altitude is caused by variations in the jet stream and other local wind shears, although areas of significant convective activity (thunderstorms) in the troposphere below may produce turbulence as a result of convective overshoot.

On October 24, 2014, Alan Eustace became the record holder for reaching the altitude record for a manned balloon at 135,890 ft (41,419 m). Eustace also broke the world records for vertical speed skydiving, reached with a peak velocity of 1,321 km/h (821 mph) and total freefall distance of 123,414 ft (37,617 m), lasting 4 minutes and 27 seconds.

== Circulation and mixing ==
The stratosphere is a region of intense interactions among radiative, dynamical, and chemical processes, in which the horizontal mixing of gaseous components proceeds much more rapidly than does vertical mixing. The overall circulation of the stratosphere is termed as Brewer-Dobson circulation, which is a single-celled circulation, spanning from the tropics up to the poles, consisting of the tropical upwelling of air from the tropical troposphere and the extra-tropical downwelling of air. Stratospheric circulation is a predominantly wave-driven circulation in that the tropical upwelling is induced by the wave force by the westward propagating Rossby waves, in a phenomenon called Rossby-wave pumping.

An interesting feature of stratospheric circulation is the quasi-biennial oscillation (QBO) in the tropical latitudes, which is driven by gravity waves that are convectively generated in the troposphere. The QBO induces a secondary circulation that is important for the global stratospheric transport of tracers, such as ozone or water vapor.

Another large-scale feature that significantly influences stratospheric circulation is the breaking planetary waves resulting in intense quasi-horizontal mixing in the midlatitudes. This breaking is much more pronounced in the winter hemisphere where this region is called the surf zone. This breaking is caused due to a highly non-linear interaction between the vertically propagating planetary waves and the isolated high potential vorticity region known as the polar vortex. The resultant breaking causes large-scale mixing of air and other trace gases throughout the midlatitude surf zone. The timescale of this rapid mixing is much smaller than the much slower timescales of upwelling in the tropics and downwelling in the extratropics.

During northern hemispheric winters, sudden stratospheric warmings, caused by the absorption of Rossby waves in the stratosphere, can be observed in approximately half of the winters when easterly winds develop in the stratosphere. These events often precede unusual winter weather and may even be responsible for the cold European winters of the 1960s.

Stratospheric warming of the polar vortex results in its weakening. When the vortex is strong, it keeps the cold, high-pressure air masses contained in the Arctic; when the vortex weakens, air masses move equatorward, and results in rapid changes of weather in the mid latitudes.

== Upper-atmospheric lightning ==
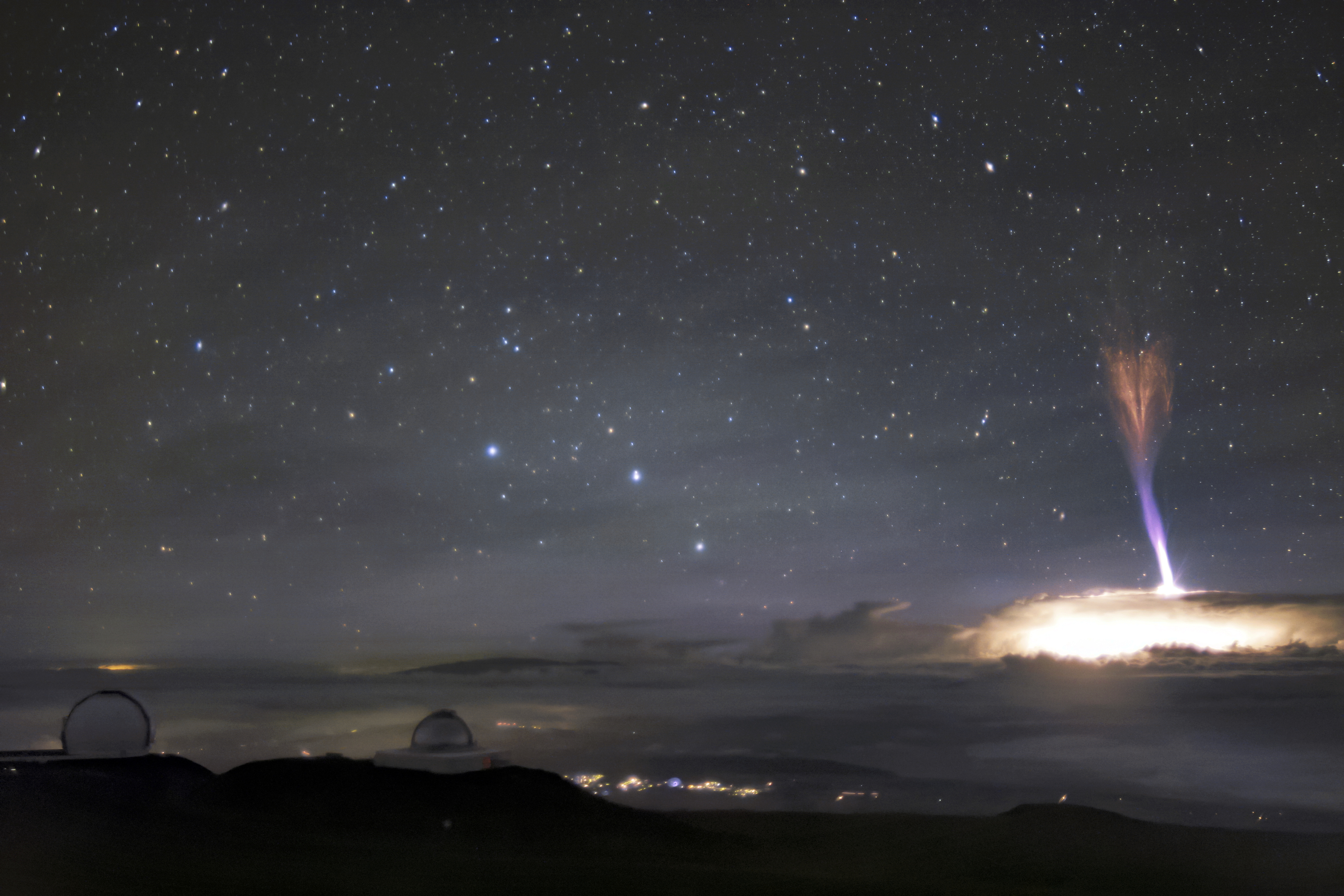
Lightning extending above the troposphere into the stratosphere as blue jet and reaching into the mesosphere as red sprite

Upper-atmospheric lightning is a family of short-lived electrical breakdown phenomena that occur well above the altitudes of normal lightning and storm clouds. Upper-atmospheric lightning is believed to be electrically induced forms of luminous plasma. Lightning extending above the troposphere into the stratosphere is referred to as blue jet, and that reaching into the mesosphere as red sprite.

== Life ==
Lofted in the stratosphere by air currents, bacterial life has been collected by balloon samples and aircraft and found to survive for a period of time, making it the upper altitudinal limit of the biosphere. In 2001, dust was collected at a height of 41 kilometers in a high-altitude balloon experiment and was found to contain bacterial material when examined later in the laboratory.

== See also ==
- Le Grand Saut
- Lockheed U-2
- Overshooting top
- Ozone depletion
- Batterie Pommern (the first projectile to reach the lower stratosphere)
- Paris Gun (projectile was the first artificial object to reach the upper stratosphere)
- Perlan Project
- Project Excelsior, world record for highest recorded jump 1961–2012
- Red Bull Stratos, world record for highest recorded jump 2012–2014
- RQ-4 Global Hawk
- Service ceiling
- Upper-atmospheric lightning
- Sudden stratospheric warming
