= Mesosphere =

Layer of the atmosphere directly above the stratosphere and below the thermosphere

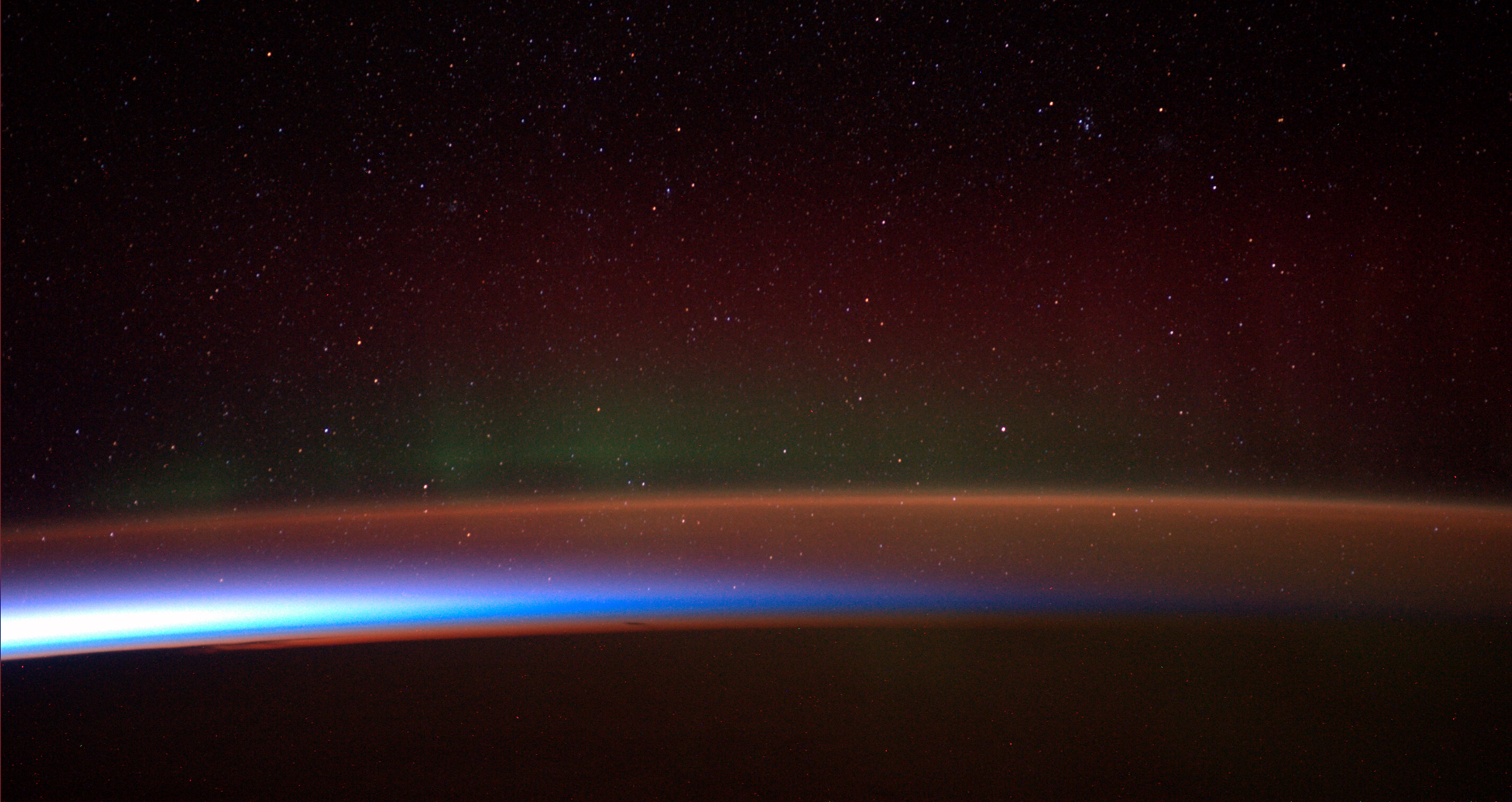
Earth's atmosphere as it appears from space, as bands of different colours at the horizon. From the bottom, afterglow illuminates the troposphere in orange with silhouettes of clouds, and the stratosphere in white and blue. Next the mesosphere (pink area) extends to just below the edge of space at one hundred kilometers and the pink line of airglow of the lower thermosphere (dark), which hosts green and red aurorae over several hundred kilometers.

Diagram showing the five primary layers of the Earth's atmosphere: exosphere, thermosphere, mesosphere, stratosphere, and troposphere. From Earths surface to the top of the stratosphere (50 km) is just under 1% of Earth's radius.

The mesosphere (/ˈmɛsəsfɪər, ˈmɛz-, ˈmiːsə-, -zə-/; from Ancient Greek μέσος (mésos) 'middle' and -sphere) is the third layer of the atmosphere, directly above the stratosphere and directly below the thermosphere. In the mesosphere, temperature increases with height (due to particle velocity), but the average temperature decreases as altitude increases. This characteristic is used to define limits,: it begins at the top of the stratosphere (sometimes called the stratopause), and ends at the mesopause, which is the coldest part of Earth's atmosphere, with temperatures below −143 °C (−225 °F; 130 K). The exact upper and lower boundaries of the mesosphere vary with latitude and with season (higher in winter and at the tropics, lower in summer and at the poles), but the lower boundary is usually located at altitudes from 47 to 51 km (29 to 32 mi; 154,000 to 167,000 ft) above sea level, and the upper boundary (the mesopause) is usually from 85 to 100 km (53 to 62 mi; 279,000 to 328,000 ft).

The stratosphere and mesosphere are sometimes collectively referred to as the "middle atmosphere", which spans altitudes approximately between 12 and 80 km (7.5 and 49.7 mi) above Earth's surface. The mesopause, at an altitude of 80–90 km (50–56 mi), separates the mesosphere from the thermosphere—the second-outermost layer of Earth's atmosphere. On Earth, the mesopause nearly co-incides with the turbopause, below which different chemical species are well-mixed due to turbulent eddies. Above this level the atmosphere becomes non-uniform because the scale heights of different chemical species differ according to their molecular masses.

The term near space is also sometimes used to refer to altitudes within the mesosphere. This term does not have a technical definition, but typically refers to the region roughly between the Armstrong limit (about 62,000 ft (19 km), above which humans require a pressure suit in order to survive) and the Kármán line (where astrodynamics must take over from aerodynamics in order to achieve flight); or, by another definition, to the space between the highest altitude commercial airliners fly at (about 40,000 ft (12 km)) and the lowest perigee of satellites being able to orbit the Earth (about 45 mi (72 km)). Some sources distinguish between the terms "near space" and "upper atmosphere", so that only the layers closest to the Kármán line are described as "near space".

== Temperature ==
Within the mesosphere, temperature decreases with increasing height. This is a result of decreasing absorption of solar radiation by the rarefied atmosphere having a diminishing relative ozone concentration as altitude increases (ozone being the main absorber in the UV wavelengths that survived absorption by the thermosphere). Additionally, this is also a result of increasing cooling by CO_{2} radiative emission. The top of the mesosphere, called the mesopause, is the coldest part of Earth's atmosphere. Temperatures in the upper mesosphere fall as low as about −100 °C (173 K; −148 °F), varying according to latitude and season.

== Dynamic features ==
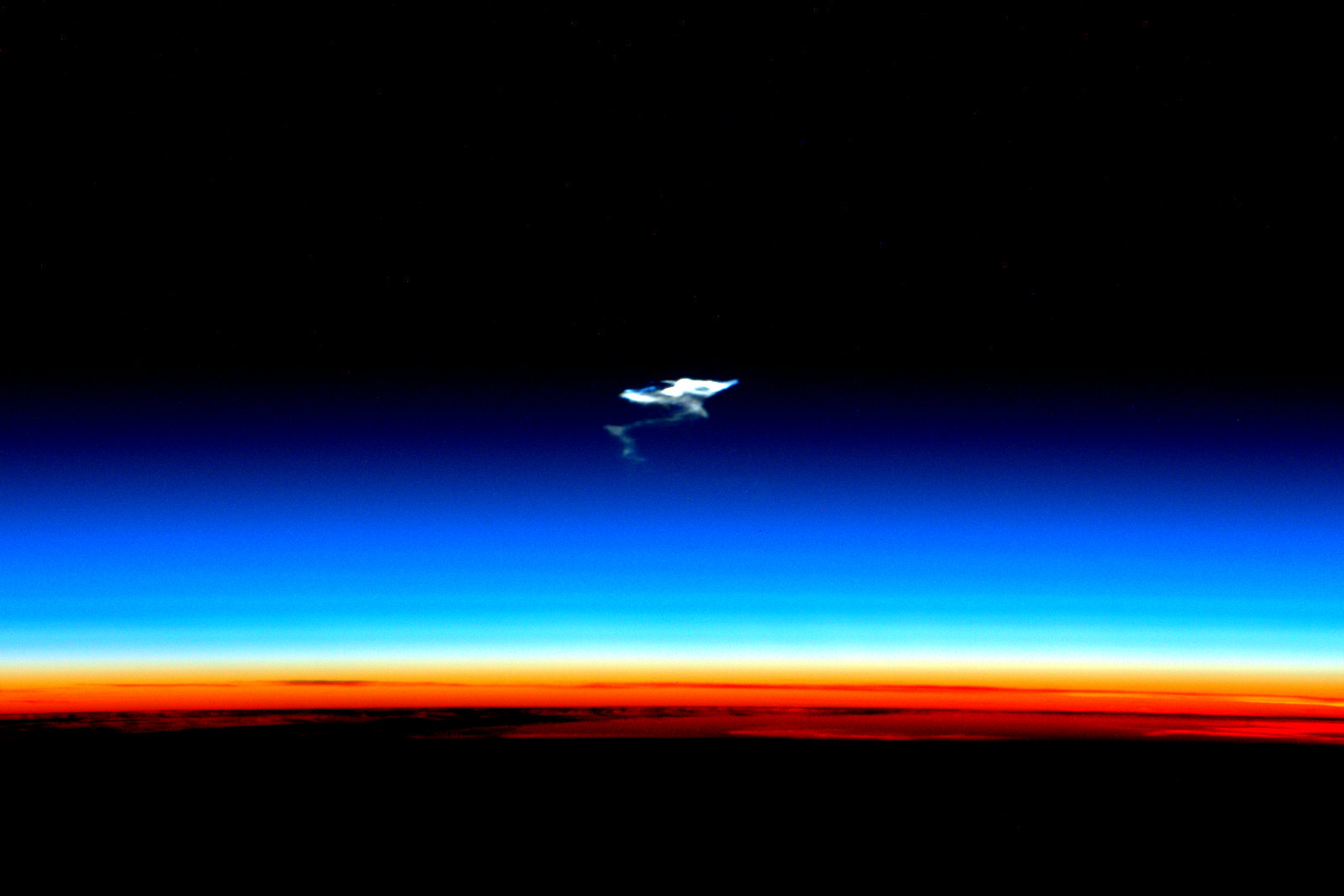
Afterglow of the troposphere (orange), the stratosphere (blue) and the mesosphere (dark) at which atmospheric entry begins, leaving smoke trails, such as in this case of a spacecraft reentry.

The main most important features in this region are strong zonal (east-west) winds, atmospheric tides, internal atmospheric gravity waves (commonly called "gravity waves"), and planetary waves. Most of these tides and waves start in the troposphere and lower stratosphere, and propagate to the mesosphere. In the mesosphere, gravity-wave amplitudes can become so large that the waves become unstable and dissipate. This dissipation deposits momentum into the mesosphere and largely drives global circulation.

Noctilucent clouds are located in the mesosphere. The upper mesosphere is also the region of the ionosphere known as the D layer, which is only present during the day when some ionization occurs with nitric oxide being ionized by Lyman series-alpha hydrogen radiation. The ionization is so weak that when night falls, and the source of ionization is removed, the free electron and ion form back into a neutral molecule.

A 5 km (3.1 mi; 16,000 ft) deep sodium layer is located between 80–105 km (50–65 mi; 262,000–344,000 ft). Made of unbound, non-ionized atoms of sodium, the sodium layer radiates weakly to contribute to the airglow. The sodium has an average concentration of 400,000 atoms per cubic centimetre. This band is regularly replenished by sodium sublimating from incoming meteors. Astronomers have begun utilizing this sodium band to create "guide stars" as part of the adaptive optical correction process used to produce ultra-sharp ground-based observations. Other metal layers, e.g. iron and potassium, exist in the upper mesosphere/lower thermosphere region as well.

Beginning in October 2018, a distinct type of aurora has been identified, originating in the mesosphere. Often referred to as 'dunes' due to their resemblance to sandy ripples on a beach, the green undulating lights extend toward the equator. They have been identified as originating about 96 km (60 mi; 315,000 ft) above the surface. Since auroras are caused by ultra-high-speed solar particles interacting with atmospheric molecules, the green color of these dunes has tentatively been explained by the interaction of those solar particles with oxygen molecules. The dunes therefore occur where mesospheric oxygen is more concentrated.

Millions of meteors enter the Earth's atmosphere, averaging 40,000 tons per year. The ablated material, called meteoric smoke, is thought to serve as condensation nuclei for noctilucent clouds.

== Exploration ==
The mesosphere lies above altitude records for aircraft, while only the lowest few kilometers are accessible to balloons, for which the altitude record is 53.0 kilometres (32.9 mi). Meanwhile, the mesosphere is below the minimum altitude for orbital spacecraft due to high atmospheric drag. It has only been accessed through the use of sounding rockets, which are only capable of taking mesospheric measurements for a few minutes per mission. As a result, it is the least-understood part of the atmosphere, resulting in the humorous moniker ignorosphere. The presence of red sprites and blue jets (electrical discharges or lightning within the lower mesosphere), noctilucent clouds, and density shears within this poorly understood layer are of current scientific interest.

On February 1, 2003, Space Shuttle Columbia broke up on reentry at about 62 km (39 mi) altitude, in the lower mesosphere, killing all seven crew members.

In 2025 scientists proposed photophoretic sunlight-powered flying structures for sustained exploration of the mesosphere, with potential applications in atmospheric sensing, communications, and exploration of thin-atmosphere planets such as Mars.

== Phenomena in mesosphere and near space ==
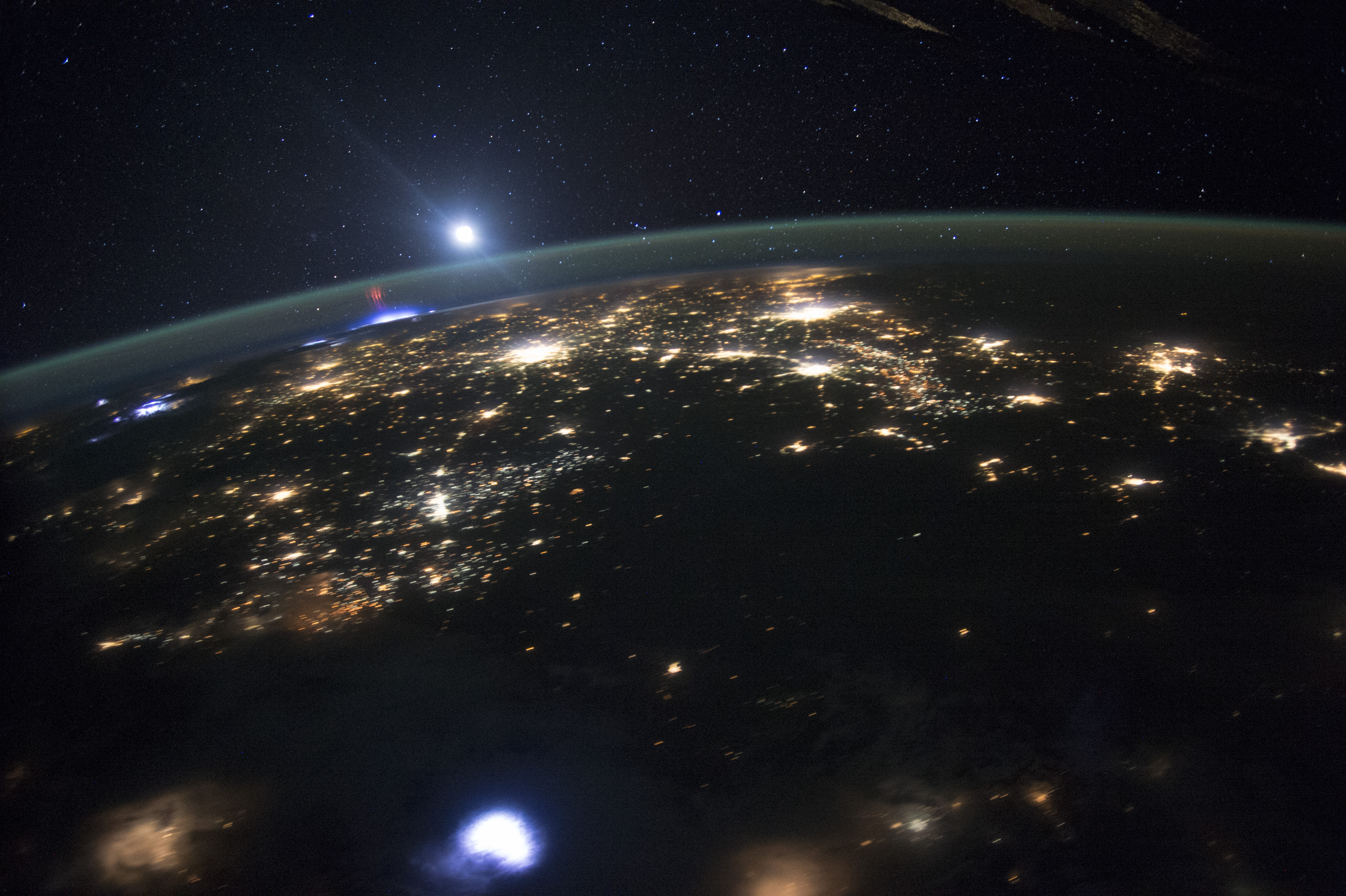
An astronaut onboard the International Space Station observes lightning at the horizon extending into the mesosphere as red sprite just below the line of airglow.

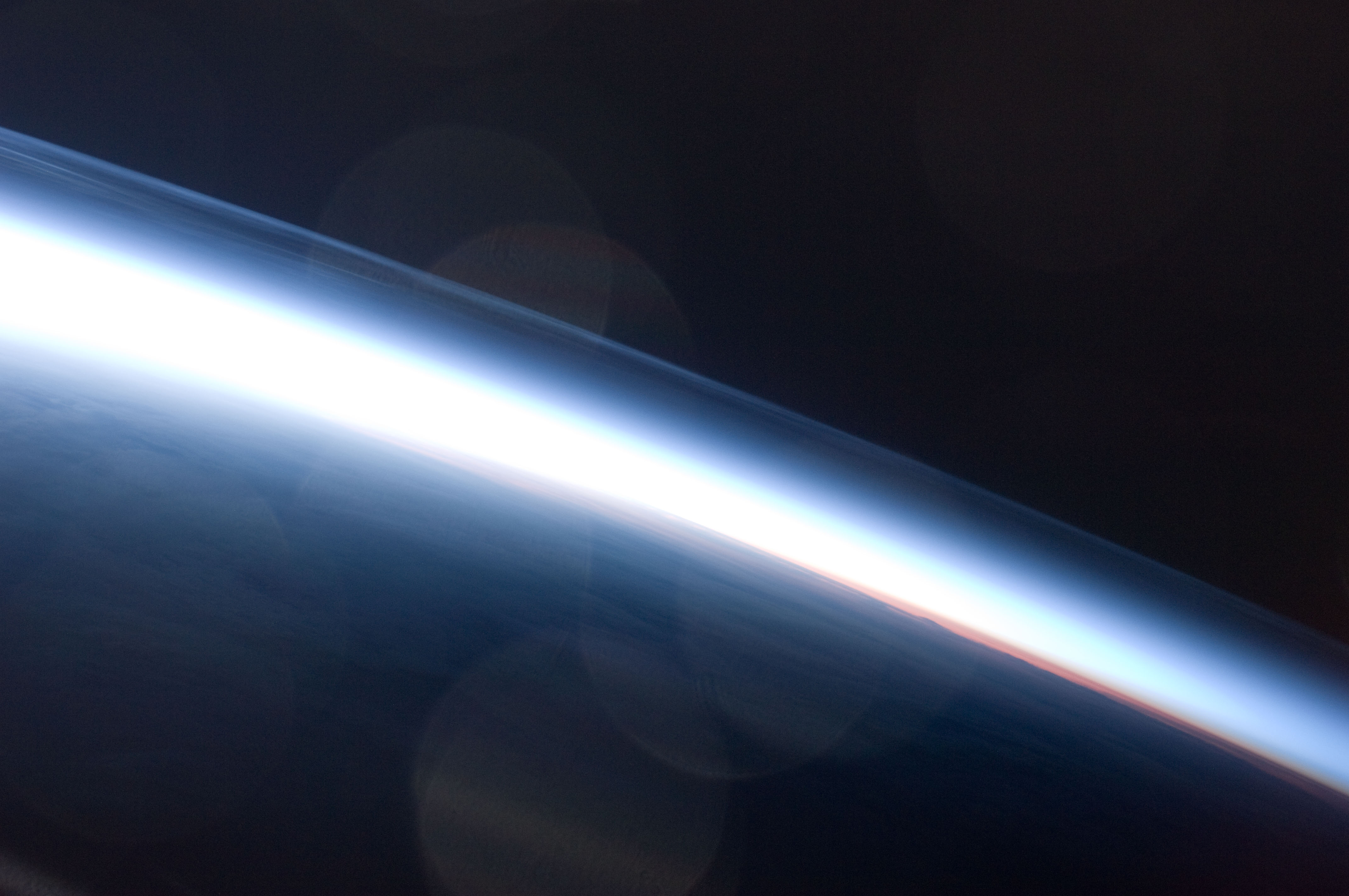
Noctilucent clouds (not to be mistaken with the slightly higher up airglow), at the upper edge of the mesosphere.

- Airglow
- Atmospheric tides
- Ionosphere
- Meteors
- Noctilucent clouds
- Polar aurora
- Sprite (lightning)
- Upper atmospheric lightning (Transient luminous event)

== See also ==
- Aeronomy
- Amateur radio high-altitude ballooning
- Geospace
- High altitude
