= Mesopause =

Boundary between the mesosphere and thermosphere

The mesopause is the point of minimum temperature at the boundary between the mesosphere and the thermosphere atmospheric regions. Due to the lack of solar heating and very strong radiative cooling from carbon dioxide, the mesosphere is the coldest region on Earth with temperatures as low as -100 °C (-148 °F or 173 K). The altitude of the mesopause for many years was assumed to be at around 85 km (53 mi), but observations to higher altitudes and modeling studies in the last 10 years have shown that in fact there are two mesopauses - one at about 85 km and a stronger one at about 100 km (62 mi), with a layer of slightly warmer air between them.

Another feature is that the summer mesopause is cooler than the winter (sometimes referred to as the mesopause anomaly). It is due to a summer-to-winter circulation giving rise to upwelling at the summer pole and downwelling at the winter pole. Air rising will expand and cool resulting in a cold summer mesopause and conversely downwelling air results in compression and associated increase in temperature at the winter mesopause. In the mesosphere the summer-to-winter circulation is due to gravity wave dissipation, which deposits momentum against the mean east–west flow, resulting in a small north–south circulation.

In recent years the mesopause has also been the focus of studies on global climate change associated with increases in CO_{2}. Unlike the troposphere, where greenhouse gases result in the atmosphere heating up, increased CO_{2} in the mesosphere acts to cool the atmosphere due to increased radiative emission. This results in a measurable effect - the mesopause should become cooler with increased CO_{2}. Observations do show a decrease of temperature of the mesopause, though the magnitude of this decrease varies and is subject to further study. Modeling studies of this phenomenon have also been carried out.

== See also ==
- Jet stream
- Maximum parcel level
