= Thomas Ashcraft =

American scientist, scientific instrument-maker, and artist

Thomas Ashcraft (born 1951, Springfield, Illinois) is an American astronomer, naturalist, scientific instrument-maker, and artist. He is known for his observations of transient luminous events (lightning sprites), meteoric fireballs, solar radio and optical phenomena, and Jupiter radio emissions.

He is an artist and citizen scientist whose work, Heliotown II, is on exhibit in the old pool house located on the Hyde Park campus at the Santa Fe Institute. He resides and maintains a laboratory and studio west of Villanueva, New Mexico where he operates the Observatory of Heliotown. Research-grade images, audio, and video captured at the observatory have been featured on NASA's Astronomy Picture of the Day blog.

Living isolated from the technological world in New Mexico, Ashcraft started to self learn radio astronomy in 1990.

== Science practice ==
In 1992, Ashcraft built the Fast Drift Burst Observatory, also called the Radio Fireball Observatory for monitoring and recording fireballs, space dust, and meteoric phenomena. He has made numerous innovations in the merging of optical and radio telescope technology. In 2001, he began observing Jupiter, the sun and ionospheric phenomena with NASA's Radio Jove Project.

In 2009, Ashcraft began noting lightning-generated phenomena called transient luminous events (red sprites) on his radio-optical telescope systems. Over time he has established a multi-faceted observatory devoted to the capture and study of this rarely imaged phenomenon.

== Art practice ==
Ashcraft is primarily a sculptor and installation artist incorporating space, time, mind, sound, and electricity. He is also a figurative sculptor exploring biological subjects such bacteriophages, viruses, microbes, and medicinal plants. He was awarded a Louis Comfort Tiffany Prize in art in 2005.

== Selected publications ==
Papers

- Gaopeng Lu, Steven A. Cummer, Jingbo Li, Lucian Zigoneanu, Walter A. Lyons, Mark A. Stanley, William Rison, Paul R. Krehbiel, Harald E. Edens, Ronald J. Thomas, William H. Beasley, Stephanie A. Weiss, Richard J. Blakeslee, Eric C. Bruning, Donald R. MacGorman, Tiffany C. Meyer, Kevin Palivec, Thomas Ashcraft, and Tim Samaras (2013) Coordinated observations of sprites and in-cloud lightning flash structure, American Geophysical Union, JGR Atmospheres
- Walter A. Lyons, T.A. Wanrenr, T.J. Lang, W. Rison, S.A. Cummer, M.G. McHarg, T. Ashcraft, K. Paliivec, J. Yue, T.E. Nelson, H.E. Edens, and M.A. Stanley (2015) Video and Photographic Investigations of Lightning and Transient Luminous Events, American Meteorological Society
- Timothy J. Lang, Walter A. Lyons, Steven A. Cummer, Brody R. Fuchs, Brenda Dolan, Steven A. Rutledge, Paul Krehbiel, William Rison, Mark Stanley, Thomas Ashcraft (2016) Observations of two sprite-producing storms in Colorado, American Geophysical Union, JGR Atmospheres
- David Typinski, Charles Higgins, Richard Flagg, Wes Greenman, Jim Sky, Roger Giuntini, Francisco Reyes, Shing F. Fung, James Brown, Thomas Ashcraft, Larry Dodd, James Thieman, and Leonard Garcia (2020) A Fresh Look at Jovian Decametric Radio Emission Occurrence Probabilities in the CML-Io Phase Plane, American Geophysical Union/NASA conference poster
- Shing F. Fung, Todd S. Anderson, Thomas Ashcraft, Wes Greenman, David Typinski, and James Brown (2020) Thunderstorms as Possible HF Radiation Sources of Propagation TeePee Signatures, American Geophysical Union/NASA conference poster
