= Stratopause =

Upper boundary of the stratosphere

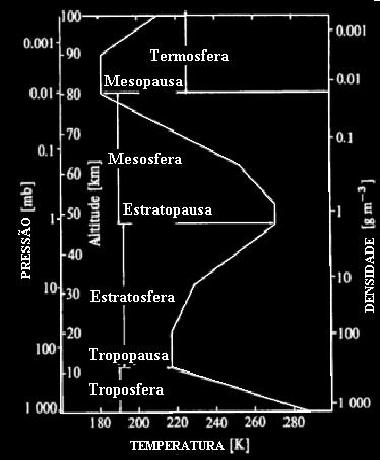

The stratopause (formerly mesopeak) is the level of the atmosphere which is the boundary between two layers: the stratosphere and the mesosphere. In the stratosphere, the temperature increases with altitude, and the stratopause is the region where a maximum in the temperature occurs. This atmospheric feature is not exclusive to Earth, but also occurs on any other planet or moon with an atmosphere. According to James Kasting, planets whose atmospheres do not absorb shortwave sunlight, such as Venus and Mars, do not have a stratosphere and thus have no stratopause.

On Earth, the stratopause is about 50 km (31 mi) above sea level. The atmospheric pressure is around 1/1000 of the pressure at sea level. The temperature in the stratopause is −2.5 °C (27.5 °F).

== See also ==
- Jet stream
- Maximum parcel level
