= Troposphere =

Lowest layer of Earth's atmosphere

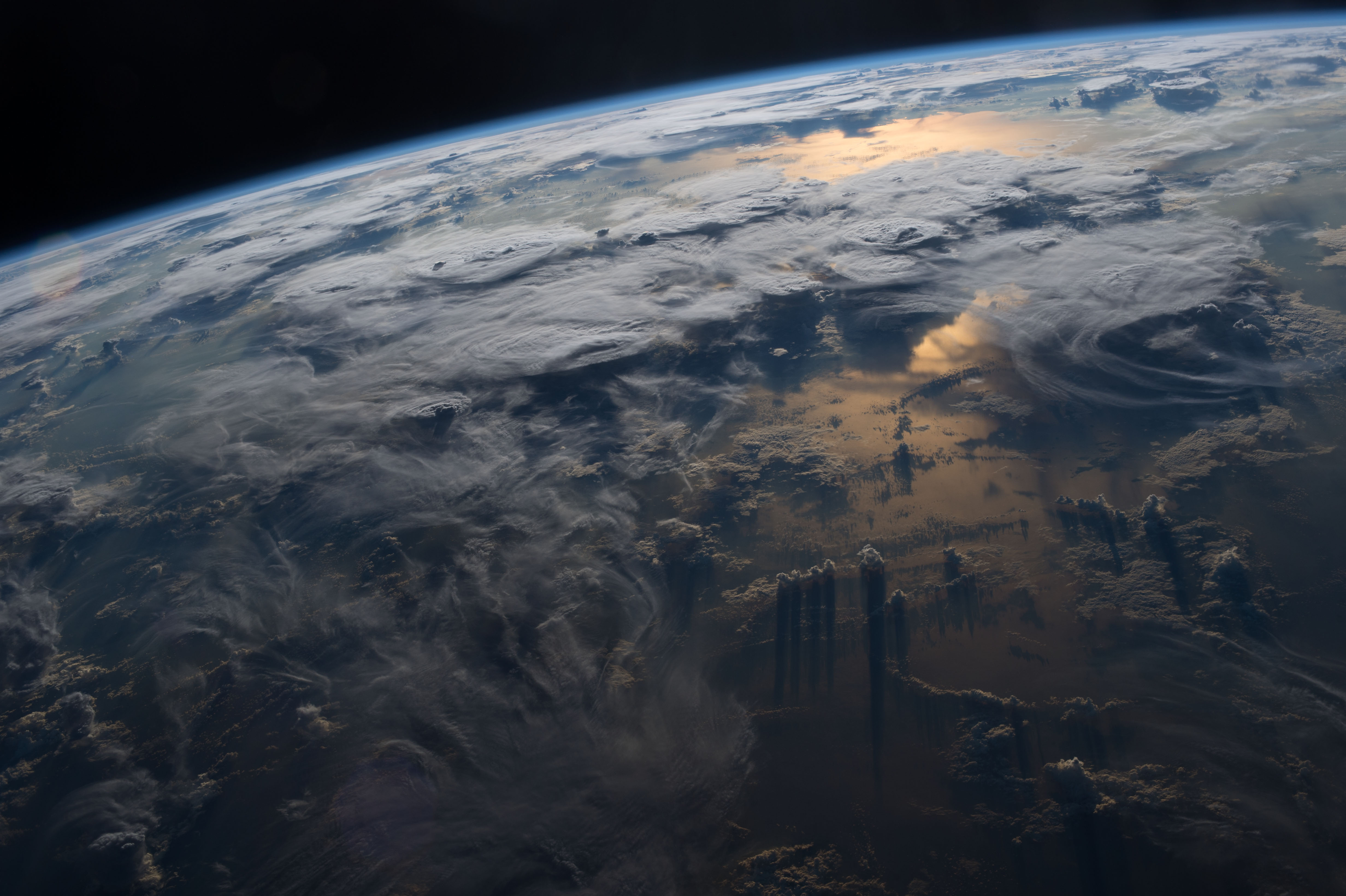
A picture of Earth's troposphere with its different cloud types of low to high altitudes casting shadows. Sunlight is reflected off the ocean, after it was filtered into a reddish light by passing through much of the troposphere at sunset. The above lying stratosphere can be seen at the horizon as a band of its characteristic glow of blue scattered sunlight.

Atmospheric circulation: the three-cell model of the circulation of the planetary atmosphere of the Earth, of which the troposphere is the lowest layer.

The troposphere is the lowest layer of the atmosphere of Earth. Pronounced /ˈtrɒpəsfɪərˌ-poʊ-/, the name comes from Ancient Greek τρόπος (trópos) 'turning, change' and -sphere. It contains 80% of the total mass of the planetary atmosphere and 99% of the total mass of water vapor and aerosols, and is where most weather phenomena occur. From the planetary surface of the Earth, the average height of the troposphere is 18 km (11 mi; 59,000 ft) in the tropics; 11 km (6.8 mi; 36,000 ft) in the middle latitudes; and 6 km (3.7 mi; 20,000 ft) in the high latitudes of the polar regions in winter; thus the average height of the troposphere is 13 km (8.1 mi; 43,000 ft).

The term troposphere derives from the Greek words tropos (rotating) and sphaira (sphere) indicating that rotational turbulence mixes the layers of air and so determines the structure and the phenomena of the troposphere. The rotational friction of the troposphere against the planetary surface affects the flow of the air, and so forms the planetary boundary layer (PBL) that varies in height from hundreds of meters up to 2 km (1.2 mi; 6,600 ft). The measures of the PBL vary according to the latitude, the landform, and the time of day when the meteorological measurement is realized. Atop the troposphere is the tropopause, which is the functional atmospheric border that demarcates the troposphere from the stratosphere. As such, because the tropopause is an inversion layer in which air-temperature increases with altitude, the temperature of the tropopause remains constant. The layer has the largest concentration of nitrogen.

The atmosphere of the Earth is in five layers: (i) the exosphere at 600+ km; (ii) the thermosphere at 600 km; (iii) the mesosphere at 95–120 km; (iv) the stratosphere at 50–60 km; and (v) the troposphere at 8–15 km. The distance from the planetary surface to the edge of the stratosphere is ±50 km, less than 1.0% of the radius of the Earth.

== Structure ==
=== Composition ===
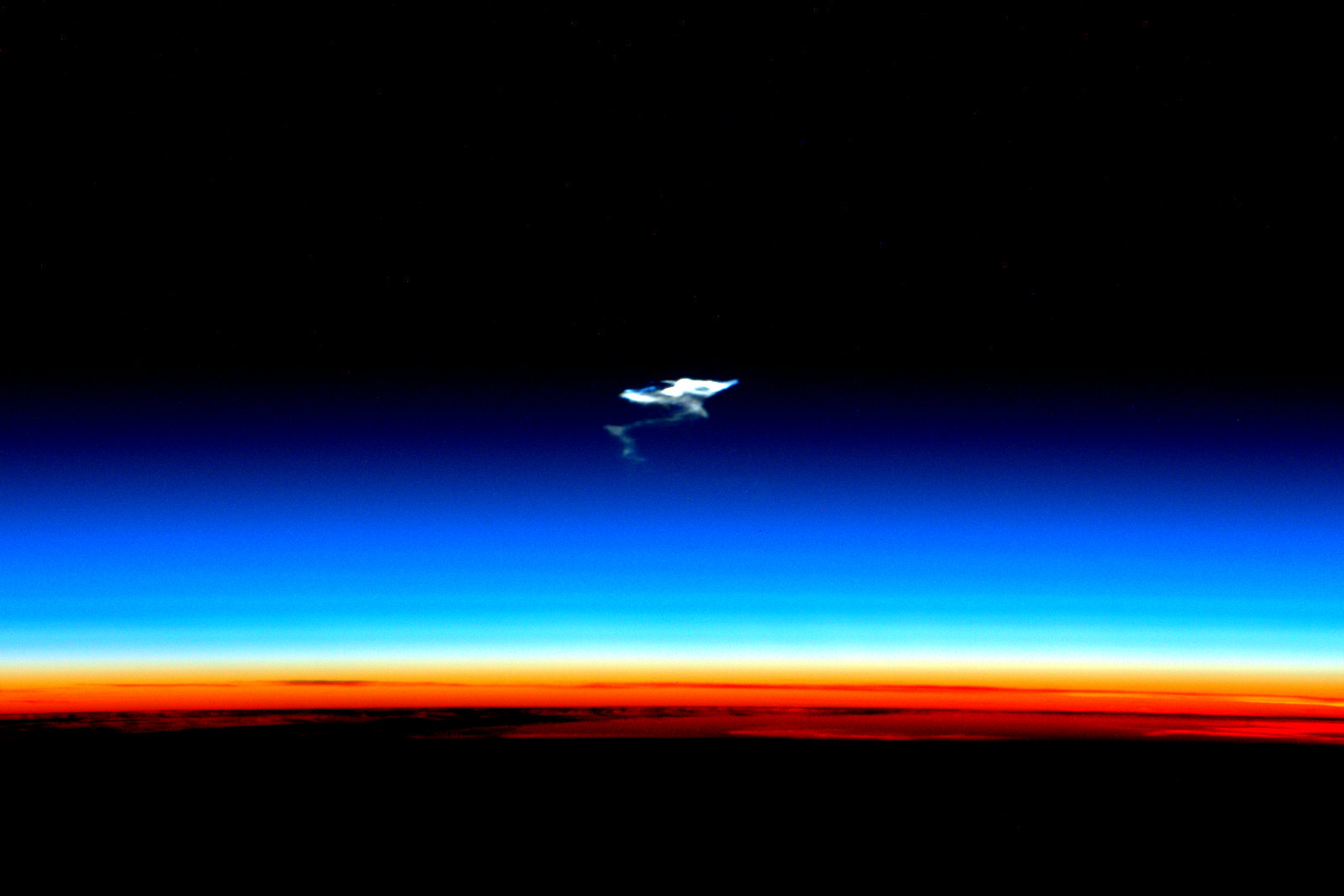
Afterglow of the troposphere (orange), the stratosphere (blue) and the mesosphere (dark), at which atmospheric entry of objects begins, as in this case of a spacecraft reentry that leaves contrails.

The Earth's troposphere is composed of a mixture of gases, which when dry is by mole fraction 78.08% nitrogen as N_{2}, 20.95% oxygen as O_{2}, 0.93% argon, 0.04% carbon dioxide as CO_{2}, and other trace gases. Additionally, the troposphere contains the vast majority of water vapor in the atmosphere. The flux of water vapor in the troposphere can slightly change these numbers, but even at the most humid, water vapor constitutes less than 5% of the local tropospheric composition. Local phenomena like combustion, volcanic eruptions, and industrial air pollution can also affect the local tropospheric composition.

=== Pressure ===
The maximum air pressure (weight of the atmosphere) is at sea level and decreases at high altitude because the atmosphere is in hydrostatic equilibrium, wherein the air pressure is equal to the weight of the air above a given point on the planetary surface. The relation between decreased air pressure and high altitude can be equated to the density of a fluid, by way of the following hydrostatic equation:

$$\frac{dP}{dz} = -\rho g_n = - \frac {mPg_n}{RT}$$

where:

- g_{n} is the standard gravity
- ρ is the density
- z is the altitude
- P is the pressure
- R is the gas constant
- T is the thermodynamic (absolute) temperature
- m is the molar mass

=== Temperature ===
The planetary surface of the Earth heats the troposphere by means of latent heat, thermal radiation, and sensible heat. The gas layers of the troposphere are less dense at the geographic poles and denser at the equator, where the average height of the tropical troposphere is 13 km, approximately 7.0 km greater than the 6.0 km average height of the polar troposphere at the geographic poles; therefore, surplus heating and vertical expansion of the troposphere occur in the tropical latitudes. At the middle latitudes, tropospheric temperatures decrease from an average temperature of 15 °C (59 °F) at sea level to approximately −55 °C (−67 °F) at the tropopause. At the equator, the tropospheric temperatures decrease from an average temperature of 20 °C (68 °F) at sea level to approximately −70 to −75 °C (−94 to −103 °F) at the tropopause. At the geographical poles, the Arctic and the Antarctic regions, the tropospheric temperature decreases from an average temperature of 0 °C (32 °F) at sea level to approximately −45 °C (−49 °F) at the tropopause.

==== Altitude ====
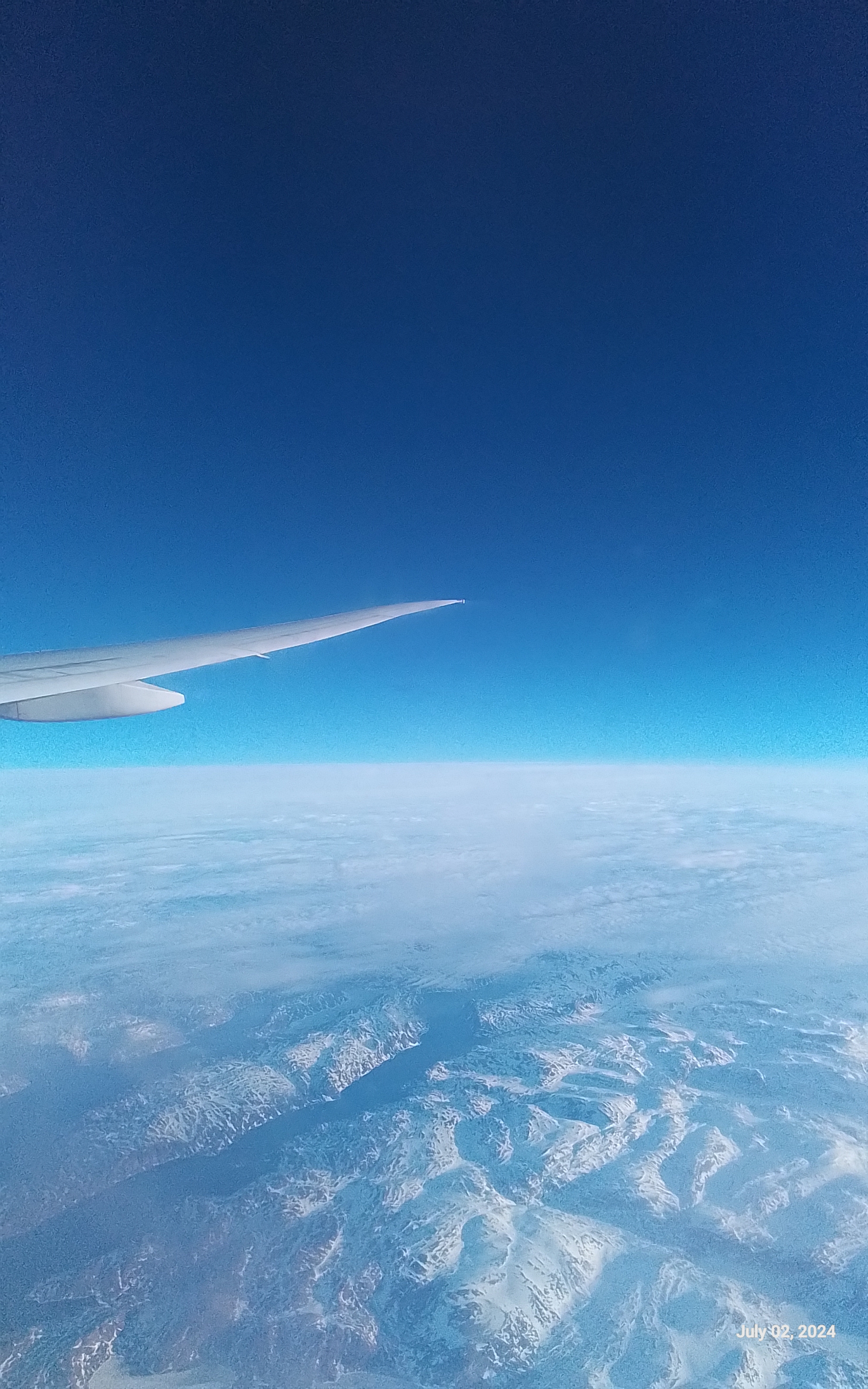
A picture of Earth's atmosphere as viewed from an airplane, traveling over the Arctic.

The temperature of the troposphere decreases with increased altitude, and the rate of decrease in air temperature is measured with the environmental lapse rate ($-dT/dz$), which is the numeric difference between the temperature of the planetary surface and the temperature of the tropopause divided by the altitude. Functionally, the ELR equation presumes that the planetary atmosphere is static and that there is no mixing of the layers of air by either vertical atmospheric convection or winds that could create turbulence.

The difference in temperature derives from the planetary surface absorbing most of the energy from the sun, which then radiates outwards and heats the troposphere (the first layer of the atmosphere of Earth) while the radiation of surface heat to the upper atmosphere results in the cooling of that layer of the atmosphere. The ELR equation also assumes that the atmosphere is static, but heated air becomes buoyant, expands, and rises. The dry adiabatic lapse rate (DALR) accounts for the effect of the expansion of dry air as it rises in the atmosphere, and the wet adiabatic lapse rate (WALR) includes the effect of the condensation-rate of water vapor upon the environmental lapse rate.

Altitude region	Environmental lapse rate (ELR)	
(m)	(°C / km)	(°F / 1000 ft)
0.0 – 11,000	6.5	3.57
11,000 – 20,000	0.0	0.00
20,000 – 32,000	−1.0	−0.55
32,000 – 47,000	−2.8	−1.54
47,000 – 51,000	0.0	0.00
51,000 – 71,000	2.8	1.54
71,000 – 85,000	2.0	1.09

==== Compression and expansion ====
A parcel of air rises and expands because of the lower atmospheric pressure at high altitudes. The expansion of the air parcel pushes outwards against the surrounding air, and transfers energy (as work) from the parcel of air to the atmosphere. Transferring energy to a parcel of air by way of heat is a slow and inefficient exchange of energy with the environment, which is an adiabatic process (no energy transfer by way of heat). As the rising parcel of air loses energy while it acts upon the surrounding atmosphere, no heat energy is transferred from the atmosphere to the air parcel to compensate for the heat loss. The parcel of air loses energy as it reaches greater altitude, which is manifested as a decrease in the temperature of the air mass. Analogously, the reverse process occurs within a cold parcel of air that is being compressed and is sinking to the planetary surface.

The compression and the expansion of an air parcel are reversible phenomena in which energy is not transferred into or out of the air parcel; atmospheric compression and expansion are measured as an isentropic process ($dS = 0$) wherein there occurs no change in entropy as the air parcel rises or falls within the atmosphere. Because the heat exchanged ($dQ = 0$) is related to the change in entropy ($dS$ by $dQ = T dS$) the equation governing the air temperature as a function of altitude for a mixed atmosphere is: $\frac{\, dS\,}{dz} = 0$ where S is the entropy. The isentropic equation states that atmospheric entropy does not change with altitude; the adiabatic lapse rate measures the rate at which temperature decreases with altitude under such conditions.

==== Humidity ====
If the air contains water vapor, then cooling of the air can cause the water to condense, and the air no longer functions as an ideal gas. If the air is at the saturation vapor pressure, then the rate at which temperature decreases with altitude is called the saturated adiabatic lapse rate. The actual rate at which the temperature decreases with altitude is the environmental lapse rate. In the troposphere, the average environmental lapse rate is a decrease of about 6.5 °C for every 1.0 km (1,000m) of increased altitude. For dry air, an approximately ideal gas, the adiabatic equation is: $p(z) \Bigl[T(z)\Bigr]^{-\frac{\gamma}{\,\gamma\,-\,1\,}} = \text{constant}$ wherein $\gamma$ is the heat capacity ratio ($\gamma \approx \,$7/5) for air. The combination of the equation for the air pressure yields the dry adiabatic lapse rate:$\frac{\,dT\,}{dz} = - \frac{\; m g \;}{R} \frac{\;\gamma\,-\,1\;}{\gamma} = -9.8^\circ\mathrm{C/km}$.

==== Environment ====
The environmental lapse rate ($dT/dz$), at which temperature decreases with altitude, usually is unequal to the adiabatic lapse rate ($dS/dz \ne 0$). If the upper air is warmer than predicted by the adiabatic lapse rate ($dS/dz > 0$), then a rising and expanding parcel of air will arrive at the new altitude at a lower temperature than the surrounding air. In which case, the air parcel is denser than the surrounding air, and so falls back to its original altitude as an air mass that is stable against being lifted. If the upper air is cooler than predicted by the adiabatic lapse rate, then, when the air parcel rises to a new altitude, the air mass will have a higher temperature and a lower density than the surrounding air and will continue to accelerate and rise.

=== Tropopause ===
The tropopause is the atmospheric boundary layer between the troposphere and the stratosphere, and is located by measuring the changes in temperature relative to increased altitude in the troposphere and in the stratosphere. In the troposphere, the temperature of the air decreases at high altitude, however, in the stratosphere the air temperature initially is constant, and then increases with altitude. The increase of air temperature at stratospheric altitudes results from the ozone layer's absorption and retention of the ultraviolet (UV) radiation that Earth receives from the Sun. The coldest layer of the atmosphere, where the temperature lapse rate changes from a positive rate (in the troposphere) to a negative rate (in the stratosphere) locates and identifies the tropopause as an inversion layer in which limited mixing of air layers occurs between the troposphere and the stratosphere.

== Atmospheric flow ==
The general flow of the atmosphere is from west to east, which, however, can be interrupted by polar flows, either north-to-south flow or a south-to-north flow, which meteorology describes as a zonal flow and as a meridional flow. The terms are used to describe localized areas of the atmosphere at a synoptic scale; the three-cell model more fully explains the zonal and meridional flows of the planetary atmosphere of the Earth.

=== Three-cell model ===
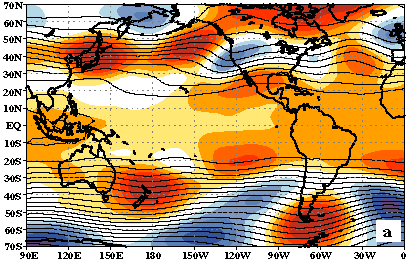
Zonal Flow: a zonal flow regime indicates the dominant west-to-east flow of the atmosphere in the 500 hPa height pattern.

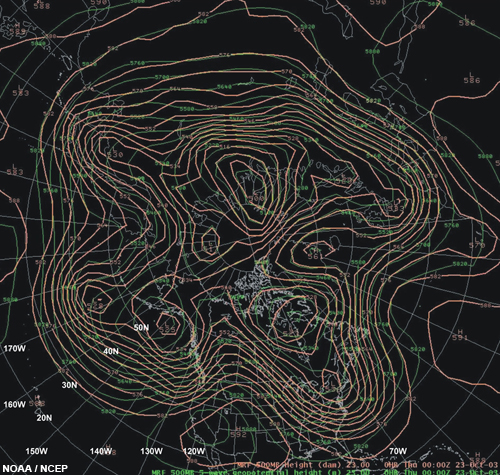
Meridional Flow: The meridional flow pattern of 23 October 2003 shows amplified troughs and ridges in the 500 hPa height pattern.

The three-cell model of the atmosphere of the Earth describes the actual flow of the atmosphere with the tropical-latitude Hadley cell, the mid-latitude Ferrel cell, and the polar cell to describe the flow of energy and the circulation of the planetary atmosphere. Balance is the fundamental principle of the model – that the solar energy absorbed by the Earth in a year is equal to the energy radiated (lost) into outer space. The Earth's energy balance does not equally apply to each latitude because of the varying strength of the sunlight that strikes each of the three atmospheric cells, consequent to the inclination of the axis of planet Earth within its orbit of the Sun. The resultant atmospheric circulation transports warm tropical air to the geographic poles and cold polar air to the tropics. The effect of the three cells is the tendency to the equilibrium of heat and moisture in the planetary atmosphere of Earth.

=== Zonal flow ===
A zonal flow regime is the meteorological term meaning that the general flow pattern is west to east along the Earth's latitude lines, with weak shortwaves embedded in the flow. The use of the word "zone" refers to the flow being along the Earth's latitudinal "zones". This pattern can buckle and thus become a meridional flow.

=== Meridional flow ===
When the zonal flow buckles, the atmosphere can flow in a more longitudinal (or meridional) direction, and thus the term "meridional flow" arises. Meridional flow patterns feature strong, amplified troughs of low pressure and ridges of high pressure, with more north–south flow in the general pattern than west-to-east flow.

== Solar System ==
Cross-section diagram of Titan's atmosphere

Within the Solar System, other planetary bodies with a substantial atmosphere have a troposphere. These include Venus, Mars, and the Saturnian moon Titan. Jupiter does not have a solid surface, and the lowest atmospheric layer, the troposphere, smoothly transitions into the planet's fluid interior.

The troposphere of Venus is the densest part of the atmosphere, starting at the surface and extendind upwards to 65 km. The winds are slow near the surface, but at the top of the troposphere the temperature and pressure reaches Earth-like levels and clouds pick up speed to 100 m/s (360 km/h). The large amount of CO_{2} in the atmosphere together with water vapour and sulfur dioxide create a strong greenhouse effect, trapping solar energy and raising the surface temperature to around 740 K (467 °C). The thick troposphere makes the difference in temperature between the day and night side small, even though the slow retrograde rotation of the planet causes a single solar day to last 116.5 Earth days. On the night side of Venus clouds can still be found at 80 km (50 mi) above the surface.

The troposphere of Mars contains most of the planet's weather phenomena, including convection and dust storms. Its dynamics are heavily driven by the daytime surface heating and the amount of suspended dust. Mars has a higher scale height of 11.1 km than Earth because of its weaker gravity. The theoretical dry adiabatic lapse rate of Mars is 4.3 °C km^{−1}, but the measured average lapse rate is about 2.5 °C km^{−1} because the suspended dust particles absorb solar radiation and heat the air. The planetary boundary layer can extend to over 10 km thick during the daytime. The near-surface diurnal temperature range is huge (60 °C) due to the low thermal inertia. Under dusty conditions, the suspended dust particles can reduce the surface diurnal temperature range to only 5 °C. The temperature above 15 km is controlled by radiative processes instead of convection. Mars is a rare exception to the "0.1-bar tropopause" rule found in the other atmospheres in our solar system.

Titan is the only planetary satellite with a substantial atmosphere, and it is the only atmosphere besides Earth's composed primarily of nitrogen. Titan's lower surface gravity creates a more extended atmosphere than Earth, with scale heights of 15–50 km (9.3–31.1 mi). The troposphere of Titan is well defined, extending to a tropopause at an altitude of around 40 km, where the temperature is 70 K. Methane condenses out of Titan's atmosphere at high altitudes, with its abundance increasing below the tropopause, leveling off at a value of 4.9% between 8 km (5.0 mi) and the surface. Methane rain, haze rainout, and varying cloud layers are found in the troposphere.

== See also ==
- Jet stream
- Trade winds
