= Afterglow =

Whitish or rosy light during twilight or after sunset

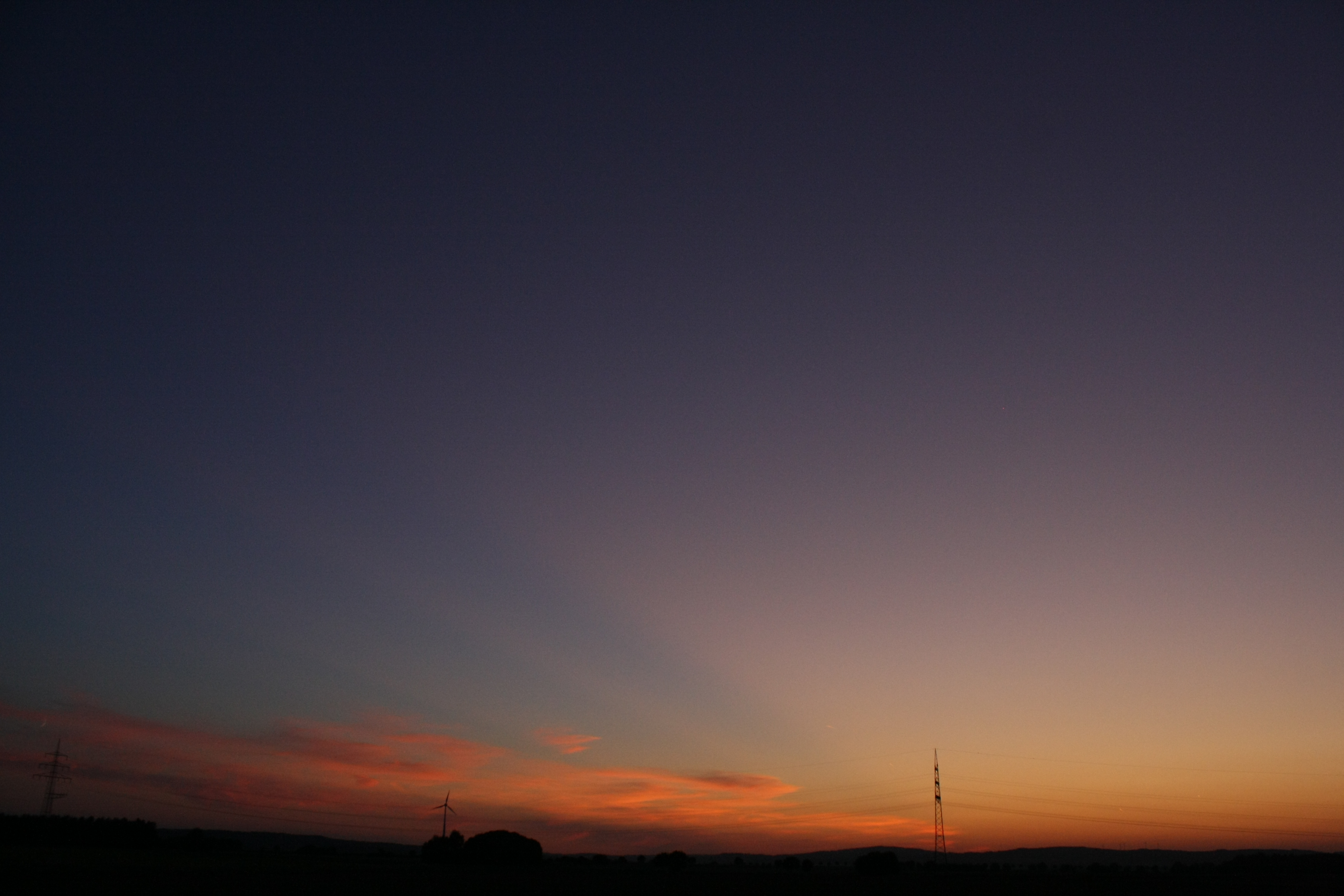
Afterglow with its bright segment and purple light above, interrupted by crepuscular rays

In meteorology, an afterglow is an optical phenomenon, generally referring to a broad arch of whitish or pinkish sunlight in the twilight sky after sunset, consisting of purple light and bright segment. It consists of several atmospheric optical phenomena. The purple light mainly occurs when the Sun is 2–6° below the horizon, during civil twilight (from sunset to civil dusk), while the bright segment lasts until the end of the nautical twilight. Similarly, a foreglow is a broad arch of whitish or pinkish sunlight in the twilight sky before sunrise, consisting of purple light and bright segment.

Afterglow is often seen in volcanic eruptions, in which the purple light might also be called volcanic purple light. In volcanic occurrences specifically, the light is scattered by fine particulates, like dust, suspended in the atmosphere. Afterglow may refer to the golden-red glowing light from the sunset and sunrise reflected in the sky in alpenglow (similar to the Belt of Venus) and in particularly for its last stage, when the purple light is reflected.

During golden hour (before sunset or after sunrise), sunlight reaches Earth intensely in its low-energy and low-frequency red component. During a period of civil twilight (after sunset or before sunrise), the red sunlight remains visible by scattering through particles in the air. Backscattering, possibly after being reflected off clouds or high snowfields in mountain regions, furthermore creates a reddish to pinkish light. On top of that, the high-energy and high-frequency components of light towards blue are scattered out broadly, producing the broader blue light of nautical twilight before or after the reddish light of civil twilight, while in combination with the reddish light producing the purple light. This period of blue dominating is referred to as the blue hour and is, like the golden hour, widely treasured by photographers and painters.

== History ==
After the 1883 eruption of the volcano Krakatoa, a remarkable series of red sunsets appeared worldwide. An enormous amount of exceedingly fine dust were blown to a great height by the volcano's explosion, and then globally diffused by the high atmospheric winds. Edvard Munch's painting The Scream possibly depicts an afterglow during this period.

== Gallery ==
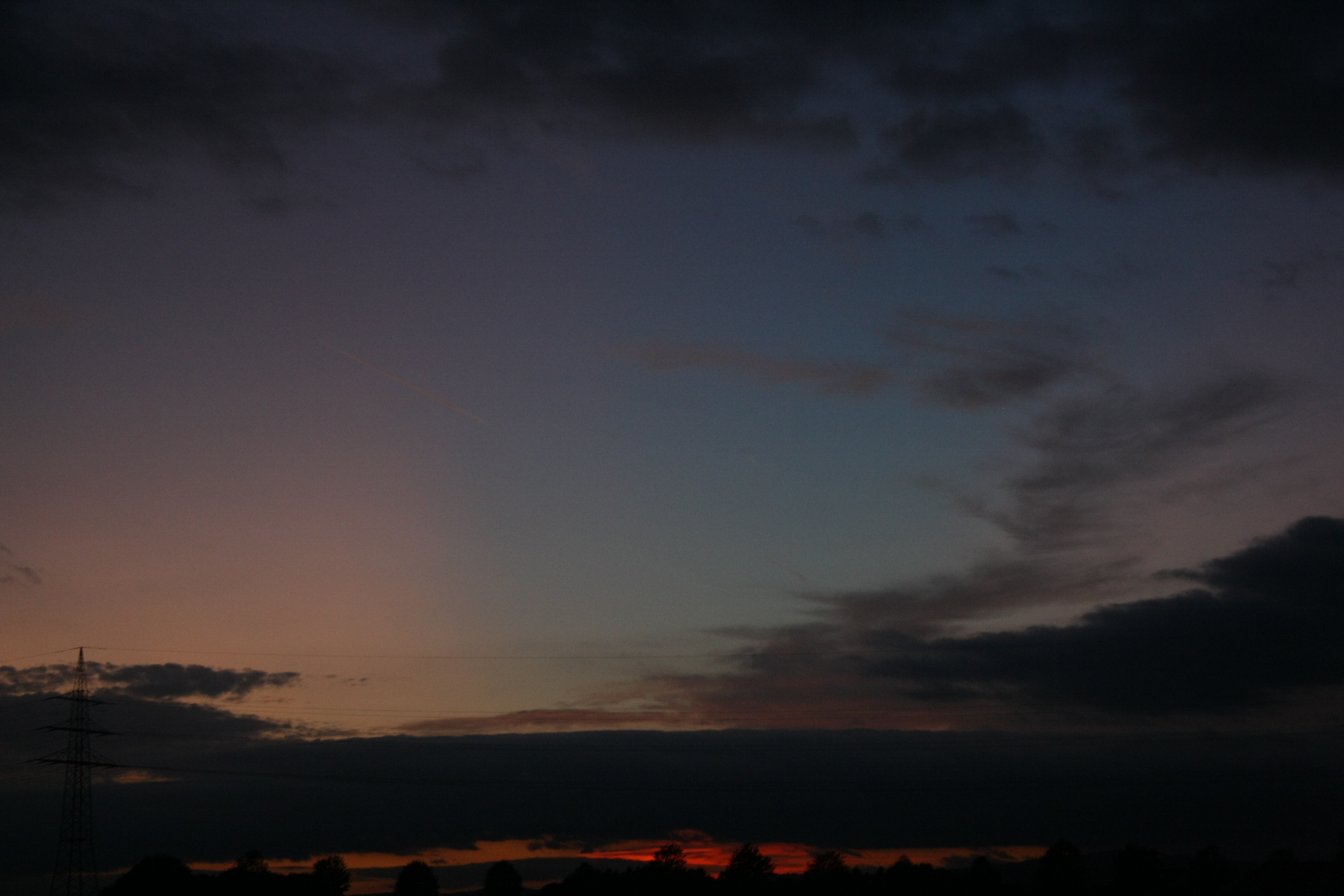
Purple light with crepuscular shadow

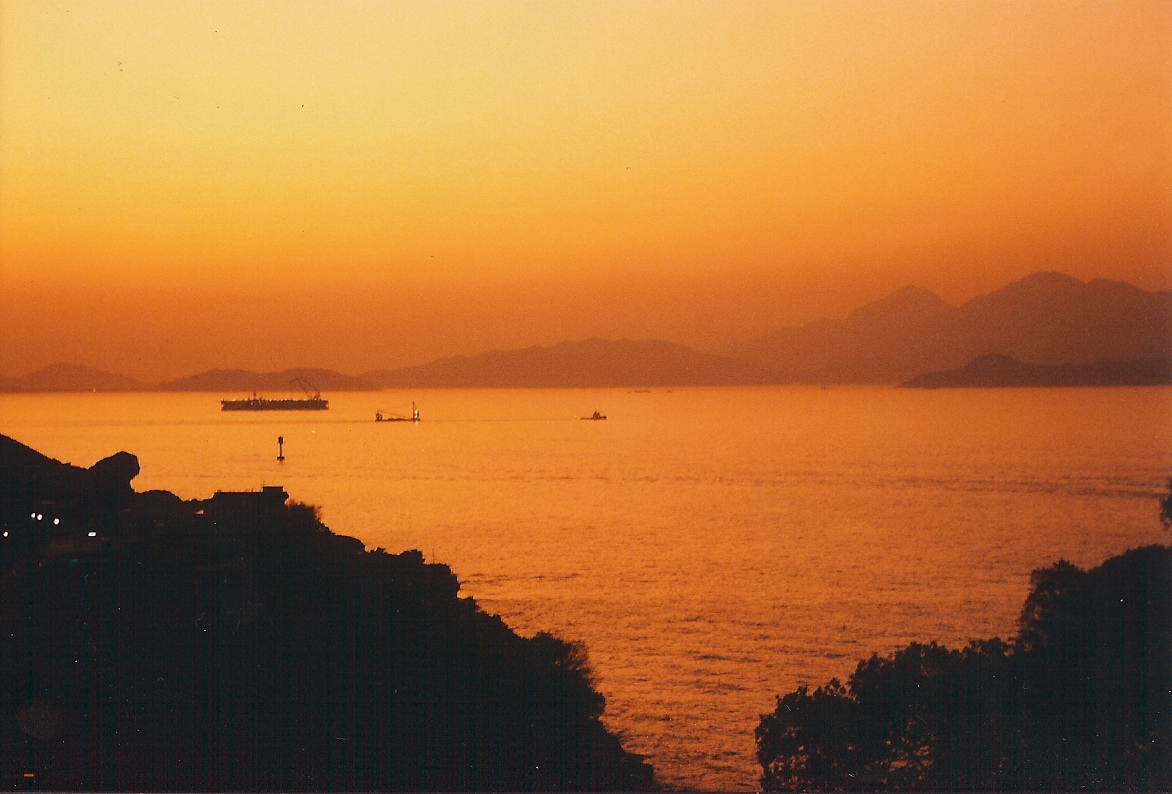
Sunset in Hong Kong after the 1991 eruption of Mount Pinatubo

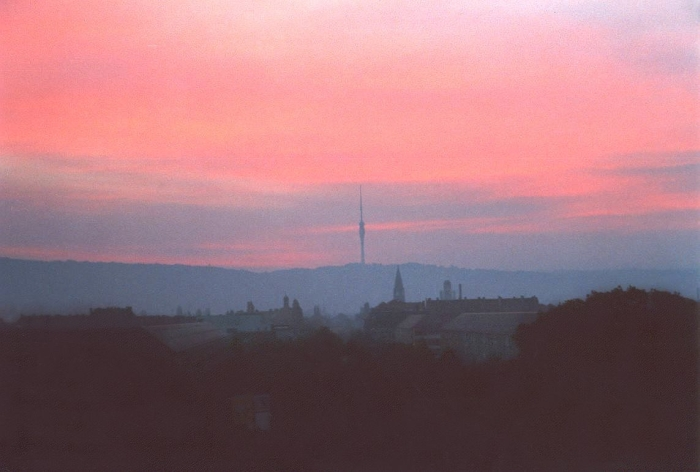
An afterglow in Dresden, Saxony, Germany

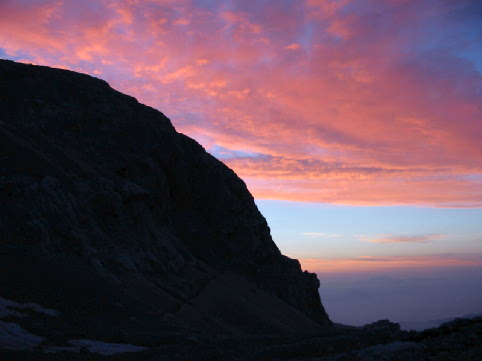
An afterglow in Slovenian mountains, near Triglav Lakes Valley

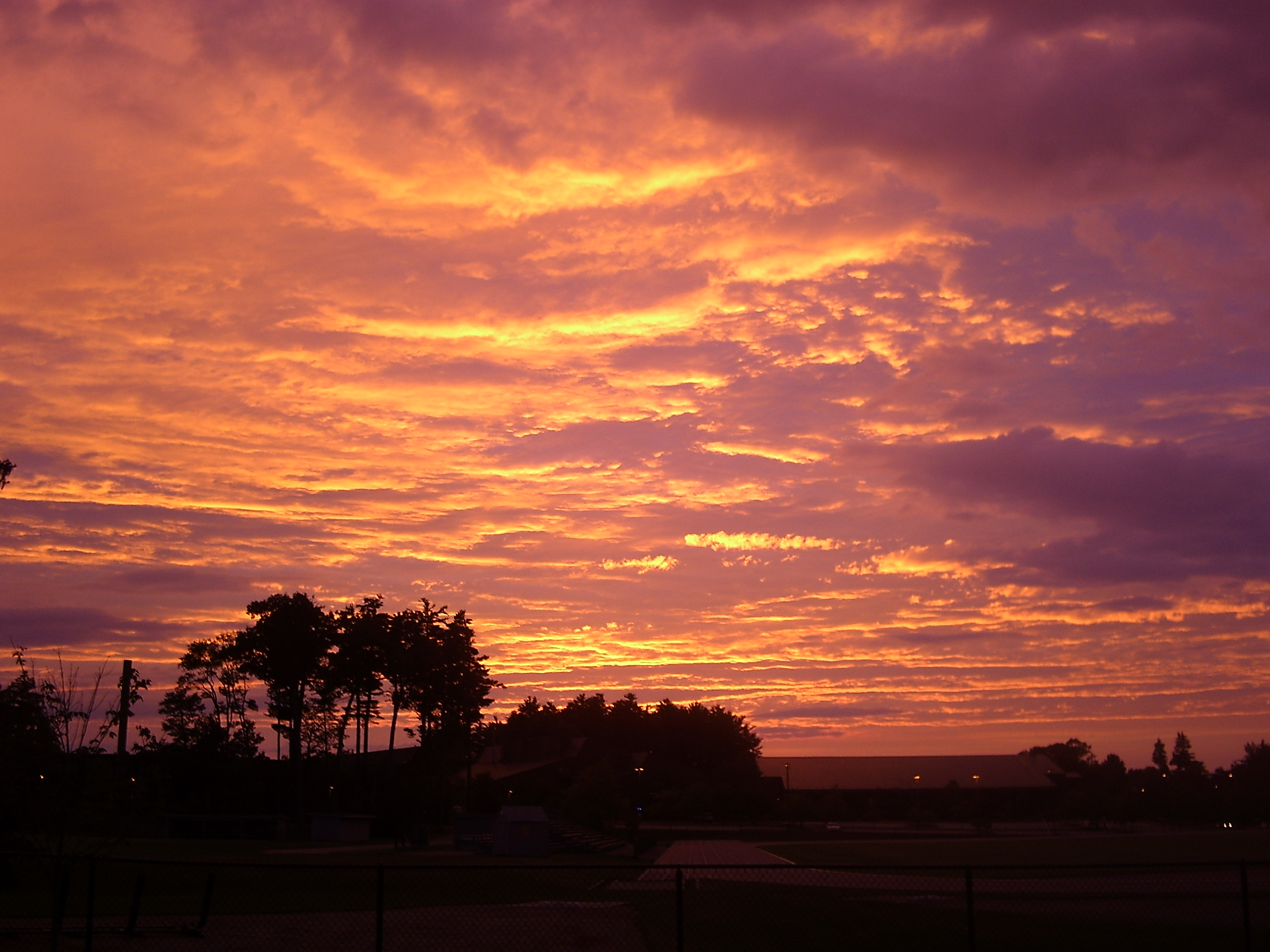
Sunset over the Bates College track in Lewiston, Maine

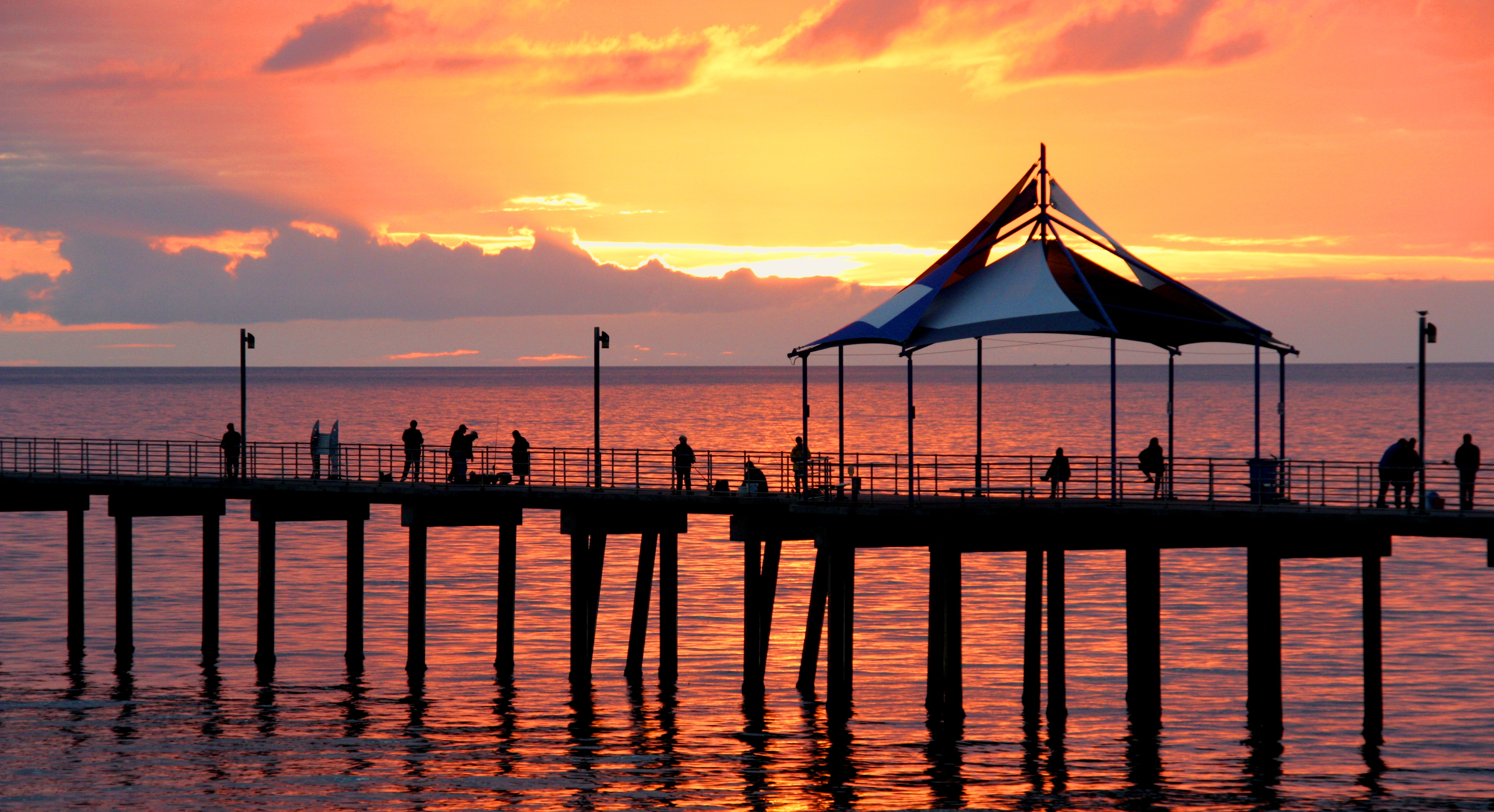
An afterglow at a pier in Australia

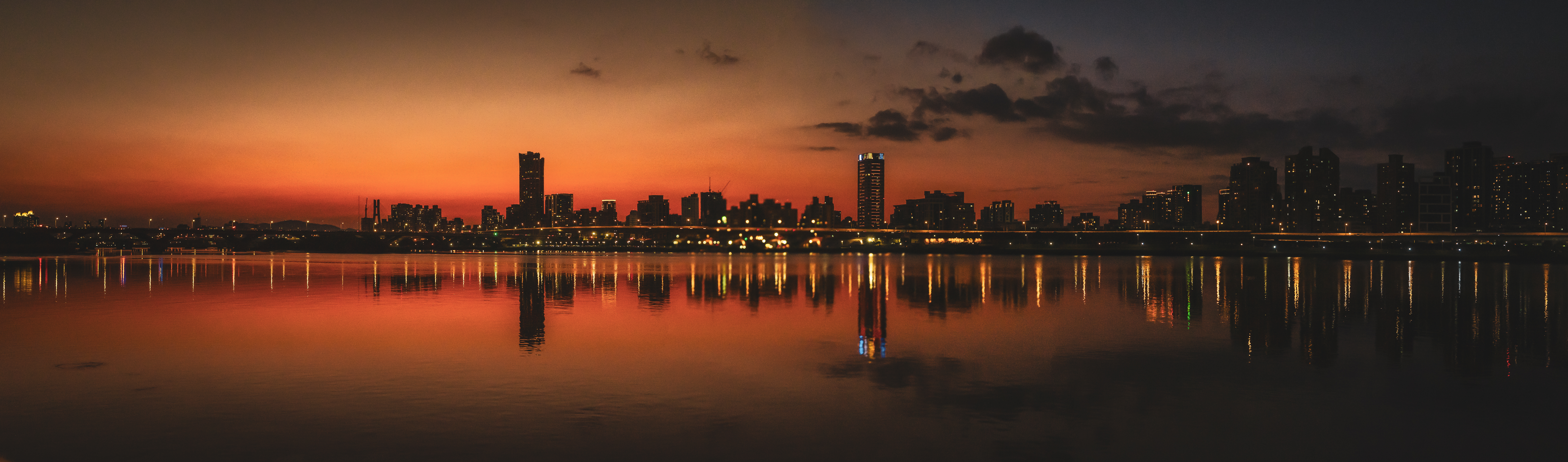
An afterglow on skyscrapers in New Taipei, Taiwan

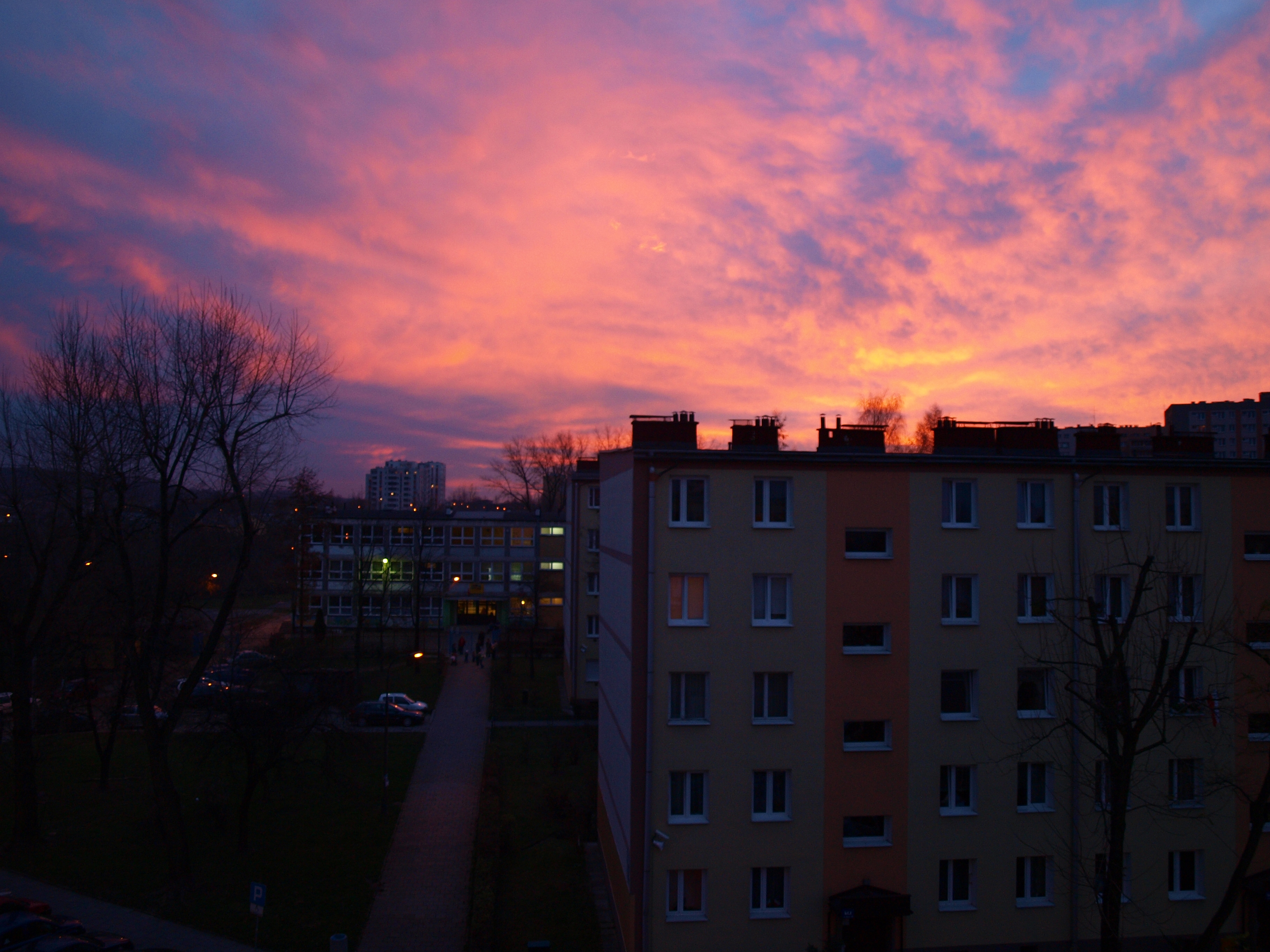
An afterglow on a Kraków housing estate

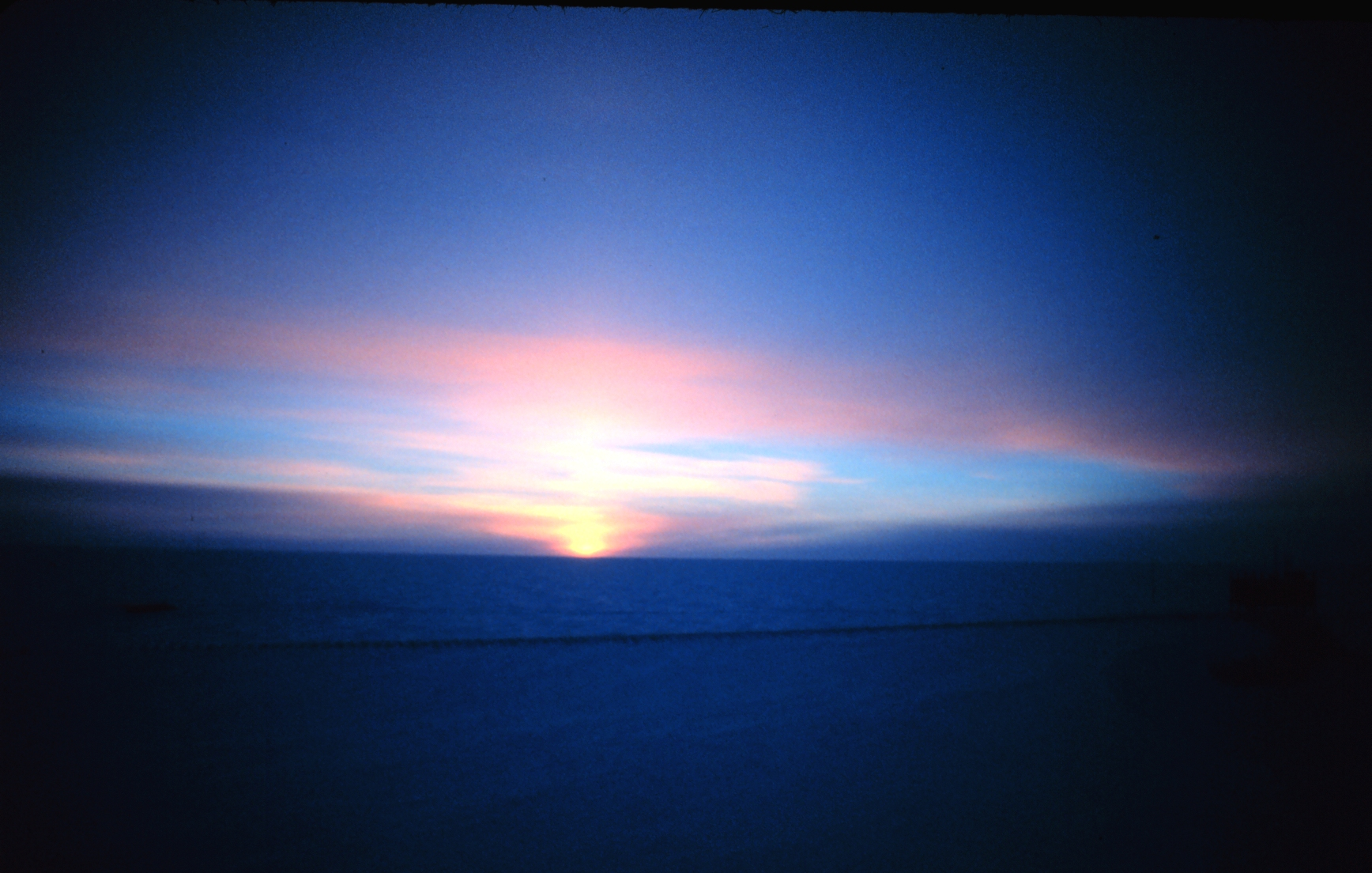
Additional to foreglow here refracted sunlight reaches the South Pole just before actual sunrise. At Earth's poles the Sun appears at the horizon only and all day around equinox, marking the change between the half year long polar night and polar day.

== See also ==
- Airglow
- Belt of Venus
- Earth's shadow
- Gegenschein
- Red sky at morning
- Sunset
