= Streamer discharge =

Type of transient electric discharge

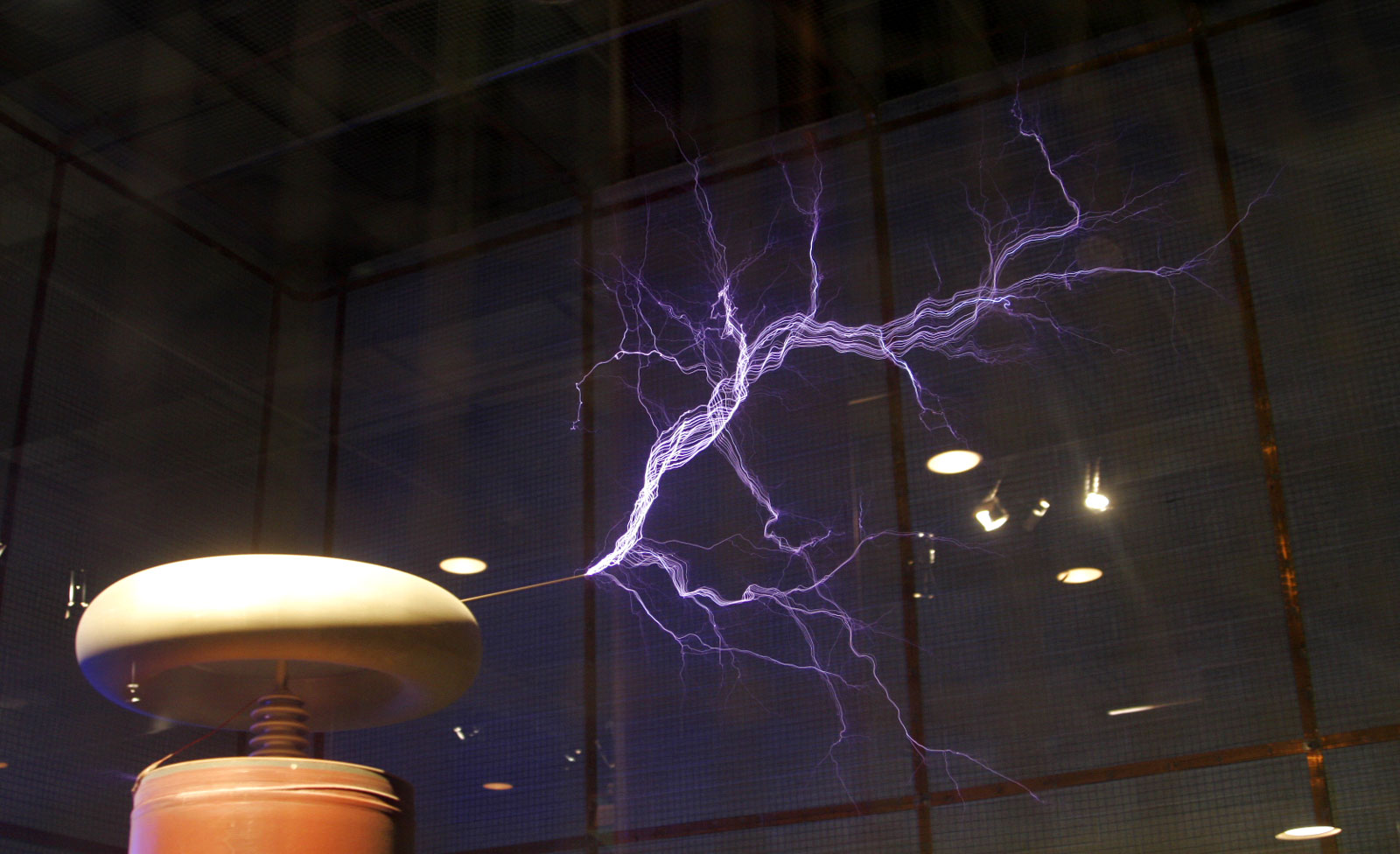
Streamer discharges into the air from the high voltage terminal of a large Tesla coil. The streamers form at the end of a pointed rod projecting from the terminal. The high electric field at the pointed end causes the air to ionize there.

Video clip of streamers from a Tesla coil. The electrostatic repulsion of ions, ionic recombination, and air convection currents due to heating tend to break up ionized regions, so streamers have a short lifetime.

In electromagnetism, a streamer discharge, also known as filamentary discharge, is a type of transient electric discharge which forms at the surface of a conductive electrode carrying a high voltage in an insulating medium such as air. Streamers are luminous writhing branching sparks, plasma channels composed of ionized air molecules, which repeatedly strike out from the electrode into the air.

Like the related corona discharges and brush discharges, a streamer discharge represents a region around a high voltage conductor where the air has suffered electrical breakdown and become conductive (ionized), so electric charge is leaking off the electrode into the air, but the opposite polarity electrode is not close enough to create an electric arc between the two electrodes. It occurs when the electric field at the surface of a conductor exceeds the dielectric strength of air, around 30 kilovolts per centimeter. When the electric field created by the applied voltage reaches this threshold, accelerated electrons strike air molecules with enough energy to knock other electrons off them, ionizing them, and the freed electrons go on to strike more molecules in a chain reaction. These electron avalanches (Townsend discharges) create ionized, electrically conductive regions in the air near the electrode. The space charge created by the electron avalanches gives rise to an additional electric field, causing the ionized region to grow at its ends, forming a finger-like discharge called a streamer.

Streamers are transient (exist only for a short time) and filamentary, which makes them different from corona discharges. They are used in applications such as ozone production, air purification or plasma medicine. If a streamer reaches the opposite polarity conductor it creates an ionized conductive path through which a large current can flow, releasing a large amount of heat, resulting in an electric arc; this is the process through which lightning leaders create a path for lightning bolts. Streamers can also be observed as sprites in the upper atmosphere. Due to the low pressure, sprites are much larger than streamers at ground pressure, see the similarity laws below.

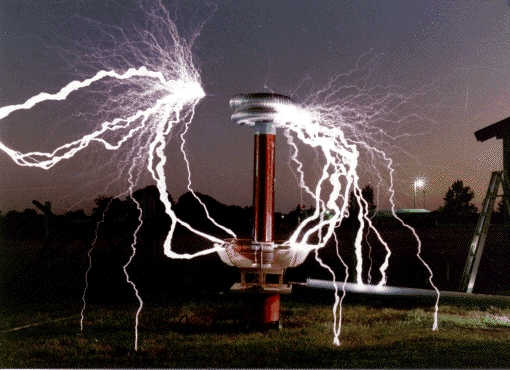
Large Tesla coil producing 3.5 meter (10 foot) streamer arcs, indicating a potential of millions of volts.

Simulation of a positive streamer discharge. Shown from left to right are: the electric field, electron density, charge density and the light emission.

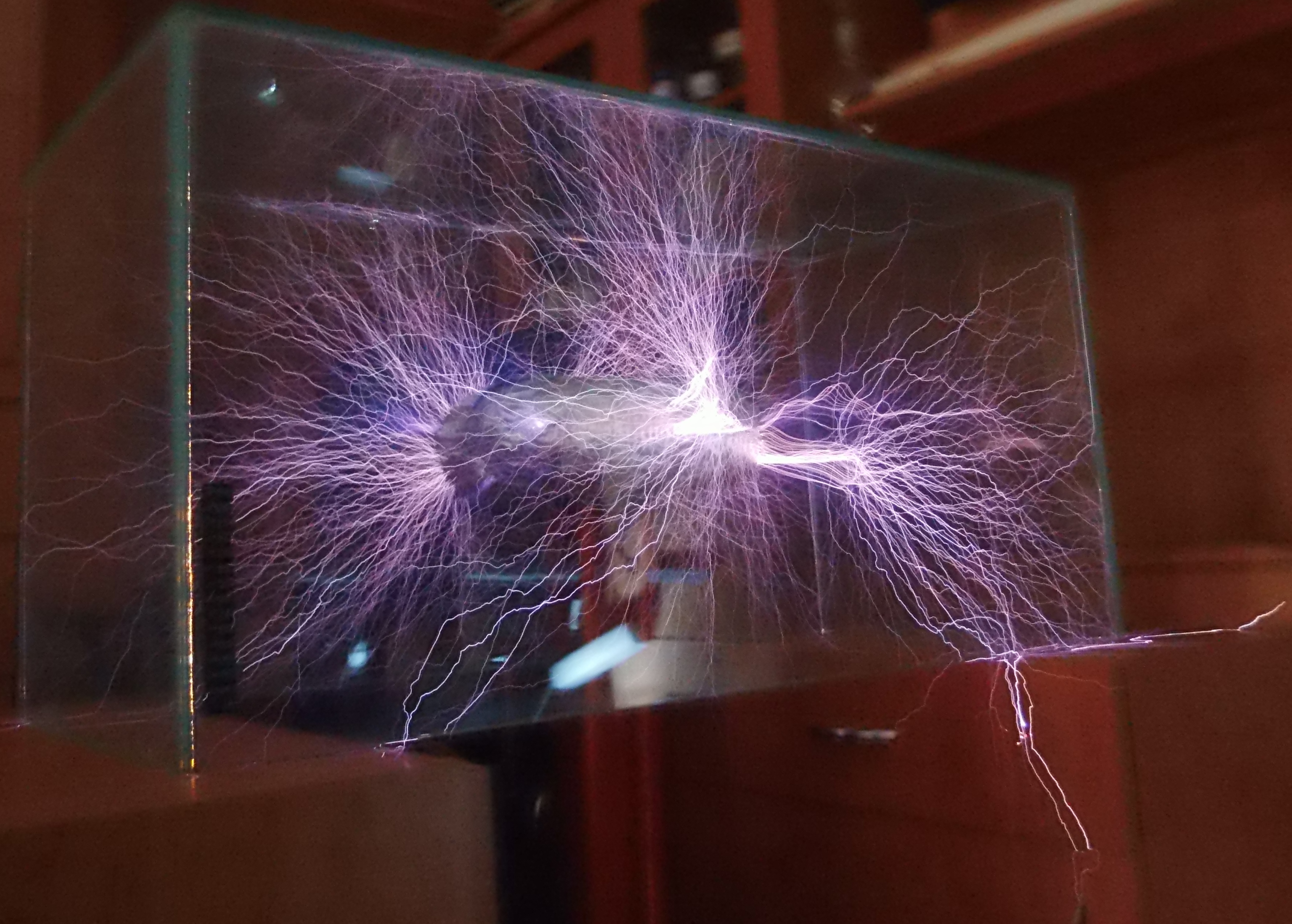
This time exposure of streamers from a Tesla coil in a glass box shows their filamentous nature.

== History ==
The theory of streamer discharges was preceded by John Sealy Townsend's discharge theory from around 1900. However, it became clear that this theory was sometimes inconsistent with observations. This was especially true for discharges that were longer or at higher pressure. In 1939, Loeb and Raether independently described a new type of discharge, based on their experimental observations. Shortly thereafter, in 1940, Meek presented the theory of spark discharge, which quantitatively explained the formation of a self-propagating streamer. This new theory of streamer discharges successfully explained the experimental observations.

== Applications ==
Streamers are used in applications such as ozone generation, air purification and plasma-assisted combustion. An important property is that the plasma they generate is strongly non-equilibrium: the electrons have much higher energies than the ions. Therefore, chemical reactions can be triggered in a gas without heating it. This is important for plasma medicine, where "plasma bullets", or guided streamers, can be used for wound treatment, although this is still experimental.

== Streamer physics ==
Streamers can emerge when a strong electric field is applied to an insulating material, typically a gas. Streamers can only form in areas where the electric field exceeds the dielectric strength (breakdown field, disruptive field) of the medium. For air at atmospheric pressure, this is roughly 30 kV per centimeter. The electric field accelerates the few electrons and ions that are always present in air, due to natural processes such as cosmic rays, radioactive decay, or photoionization. Ions are much heavier, so they move very slowly compared to electrons. As the electrons move through the medium, they collide with the neutral molecules or atoms. Important collisions are:

- Elastic collisions, which change the direction of motion of the electrons.
- Excitations, where the neutral particle is excited, and the electron loses the corresponding energy.
- Impact ionization, where the neutral particle becomes ionized, with the incident electron losing the energy.
- Attachment, where the electron attaches to the neutral to form a negative ion.

When the electric field approaches the breakdown field, the electrons gain enough energy between collisions to ionize the gas atoms, knocking an electron off the atom. At the breakdown field, there is a balance between the production of new electrons (due to impact ionization) and the loss of electrons (due to attachment). Above the breakdown field, the number of electrons starts to grow exponentially, and an electron avalanche (Townsend avalanche) forms.

The electron avalanches leave behind positive ions, so in time more and more space charge is building up. (Of course, the ions move away in time, but this a relatively slow process compared to the avalanche generation as ions are much heavier than electrons). Eventually, the electric field from all the space charge becomes comparable to the background electric field. This is sometimes referred to as the "avalanche to streamer transition". In some regions the total electric field will be smaller than before, but in other regions it will get larger, which is called electric field enhancement. New avalanches predominantly grow in the high-field regions, so a self-propagating structure can emerge: a streamer.

=== Positive and negative streamers ===
In direct current (DC) circuits, the streamers that form at electrodes with positive and negative voltages are different in appearance and form by different physics mechanisms.

Negative streamers propagate against the direction of the electric field, that is, in the same direction as the electrons drift velocity. Positive streamers propagate in the opposite direction. In both cases, the streamer channel is electrically neutral, and it is shielded by a thin space charge layer. This leads to an enhanced electric field at the end of the channel, the "head" of the streamer. Both positive and negative streamers grow by impact ionization in this high-field region, but the source of electrons is very different.

For negative streamers, free electrons are accelerated from the channel to the head region. However, for positive streamers, these free electrons have to come from farther away, as they accelerate into the streamer channel. Therefore, negative streamers grow in a more diffuse way than positive streamers. Because a diffuse streamer has less field enhancement, negative streamers require higher electric fields than positive streamers. In nature and in applications, positive streamers are therefore much more common.

As noted above, an important difference is also that positive streamers need a source of free electrons for their propagation. In many cases photoionization is believed to be this source. In nitrogen-oxygen gas mixtures with high oxygen concentrations, excited nitrogen emits UV photons which subsequently ionize oxygen. In pure nitrogen or in nitrogen with small oxygen admixtures, the dominant production mechanism of photons, however, is the Bremsstrahlung process.

=== Streamer velocity and other parameters ===
The electric streamer, strictly speaking, is an ionization front in the shape of a growing filament. One may identify, at least approximately, a set of parameters that characterizes this particularly shaped front, such as the velocity of its growth, the radius of the head etc, as well as physical laws (equations) that relate these parameters to each other. In one theory of electric streamers in air, the streamer "chooses" the maximum available velocity (with other parameters being uniquely determined by the said laws), similarly to how a linear instability, e.g., in a plasma, would "choose" the wavelength that gives the fastest growth. This approach gives good agreement with experimental data on positive streamer speeds and on the negative streamer threshold, as well as with the results from a simulation by directly solving hydrodynamic equations.

=== Similarity laws ===
Most processes in a streamer discharge are two-body processes, where an electron collides with a neutral molecule. An important example is impact ionization, where an electron ionizes a neutral molecule. Therefore, the mean free path is inversely proportional to the gas number density. If the electric field is changed linearly with the gas number density, then electrons gain on average the same energy between collisions. In other words, if the ratio between electric field $E$ and number density $N$ is constant, we expect similar dynamics. Typical lengths scale as $1/N$, as they are related to the mean free path.

This also motivates the Townsend unit, which is a physical unit of the $E/N$ ratio.

== Emission of run-away electrons and high-energy photons ==
It has been observed that discharges in laboratory experiments emit X-rays and that lightning discharges emit X-rays and terrestrial gamma-ray flashes, bursts of photons with energies of up to 40 MeV. These photons are produced by runaway electrons, electrons which have overcome the friction force, through the Bremsstrahlung process. However, it has not been fully understood how electrons can gain such high energies in the first place since they constantly collide with air molecules and lose energy. A possible explanation is the acceleration of electrons in the enhanced electric fields of the streamer tips. However, it is uncertain whether this process can really explain a sufficiently high production rate. Recently, it has been proposed that ambient air is perturbed in the vicinity of streamer discharges and that this perturbation facilitates the acceleration of electrons into the run-away regime

== The relation between pressure waves and the production of X-rays in air discharges ==
Pressure and shock waves released by electric discharges are capable of perturbing the air in their vicinity up to 80%. This, however, has immediate consequences on the motion and properties of secondary streamer discharges in perturbed air: Depending on the direction (relative to the ambient electric field), air perturbations change the discharge velocities, facilitate branching or trigger the spontaneous initiation of a counter discharge. Recent simulations have shown that such perturbations are even capable to facilitate the production of X-rays (with energies of several tens of keV) from such streamer discharges, which are produced by run-away electrons through the Bremsstrahlung process.

== See also ==
- Electrical discharge
- Sprite (lightning)
- Corona discharge
- Townsend discharge
- Avalanche breakdown
