= Heinz Raether =

German physicist (1909–1986)

- Born: Heinz Artur Raether; 14 October 1909; Nuremberg, German Empire
- Died: 31 December 1986 (aged 77); Aumühle, West Germany
- Known for: Kretschmann-Raether configuration Raether limit
- Scientific career
- Fields: Condensed matter physics Plasma physics
- Institutions: University of Jena; University of Hamburg; Göttingen Academy of Sciences and Humanities

Heinz Artur Raether (14 October 1909 — 31 December 1986) was a German physicist. He is best known for his theoretical and experimental contributions to the study of surface plasmons, as well as for Kretschmann-Raether configuration, a commonly used experimental setup for the excitation of surface plasmon resonances.

From 1944 to 1946 he was a professor of physics at the University of Jena at the Physikalisches Institut. Here he dealt with electron physics, electron microscopy, electron interference and gas discharges.

In 1951, he took over the management of the Institute for Applied Physics at the University of Hamburg. After the development of the transistor, he focused on solid state physics. His work during this period concerned the structure and growth of crystals. Later he became interested in the collective behavior of the electrons of a crystal, the solid-state electron plasma.

In gas discharge physics, he devoted himself to the ignition process, especially the formation of the spark channel, the initial phase of electrical breakdown. In 1963 he was elected a full member of the Göttingen Academy of Sciences. In 1979 he was elected a member of the Academy of Sciences Leopoldina.

== Selected publications ==
Articles

- Raether, H. (January 1933). "Elektroneninterferenzen an mechanisch bearbeiteten Oberflächen". Zeitschrift für Physik (in German). 86 (1–2): 82–104. Bibcode:1933ZPhy...86...82R. doi:10.1007/BF01340186. S2CID 121834666.
- Raether, H. (1938). "Über eine gasionisierende Strahlung einer Funkenentladung". Zeitschrift für Physik (in German). 111 (9–10): 611–624. Bibcode:1938ZPhy..110..611R. doi:10.1007/BF01340219. S2CID 122957187.
- Raether, H. (1939). "Die entwicklung der elektronenlawine in den funkenkanal". Zeitschrift für Physik (in German). 112 (7–8): 464–489. Bibcode:1939ZPhy..112..464R. doi:10.1007/BF01340229. S2CID 124856050.
- Horstmann, M.; Meyer, G.; Raether, H. (January 1959). "Messung der Intensitäten von elastisch und unelastisch gestreuten Elektronen mit einer Gegenfeldanordnung". Zeitschrift für Physik (in German). 154 (5): 633–638. Bibcode:1959ZPhy..154..633H. doi:10.1007/BF01337572. S2CID 116933196.
- Raether, H. (July–August 1967). "Surface plasma oscillations as a tool for surface examinations". Surface Science. 8 (1–2): 233–246. Bibcode:1967SurSc...8..233R. doi:10.1016/0039-6028(67)90085-4.
- Kretschmann, E.; Raether, H. (1968). "Radiative Decay of Non Radiative Surface Plasmons Excited by Light" (PDF). Zeitschrift für Naturforschung. 23: 2135–2136. doi:10.1515/zna-1968-1247. S2CID 97127159.
- Bruns, R.; Raether, H. (February 1970). "Plasma resonance radiation from non radiative plasmons". Zeitschrift für Physik. 237 (1): 98–106. Bibcode:1970ZPhy..237...98B. doi:10.1007/BF01400480. S2CID 120807595.
- Raether, H. (1977). "Surface plasma oscillations and their applications". Physics of Thin Films. 9: 145–261.
- Raether, H. (15 July 1982). "Dispersion relation of surface plasmons on gold- and silver gratings". Optics Communications. 42 (4): 217–222. Bibcode:1982OptCo..42..217R. doi:10.1016/0030-4018(82)90019-0.

Books

- Raether, Heinz (1964). Electron Avalanches and Breakdown in Gases. London: Butterworths.
- Raether, Heinz (1980). Excitation of Plasmons and Interband Transitions by Electrons. New York: Springer. ISBN 9783662157961.
- Raether, Heinz (1988). Surface Plasmons on Smooth and Rough Surfaces and on Gratings. New York: Springer. ISBN 3540173633.

== See also ==
- Raether limit
- Surface plasmon polariton
- Townsend discharge
