= Joseph Dwyer (physicist) =

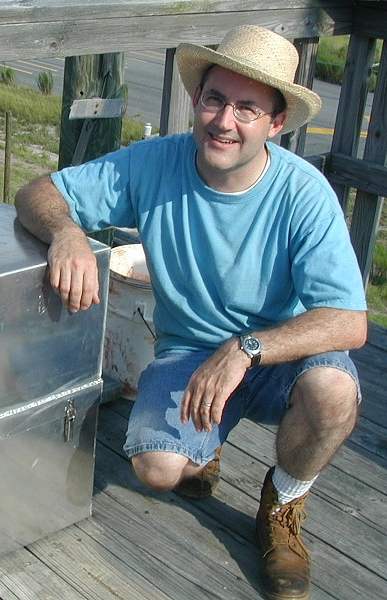
- Education: University of Chicago
- Scientific career
- Fields: Physics

Joseph R. Dwyer (born 1963) is an American physicist known for his lightning research. He is a professor of physics at the University of New Hampshire. Dwyer received his Ph.D. in physics from the University of Chicago in 1994 and worked on cosmic-ray physics and gamma-ray astronomy as a research scientist at Columbia University and the University of Maryland before joining the faculty at the Florida Institute of Technology in 2000. After moving to Melbourne, Florida, Dwyer became interested in lightning physics and his research now focuses on high-energy radiation production from thunderstorms and lightning. In 2002, Dwyer and collaborators discovered that rocket-triggered lightning produced large quantities of x-rays, allowing for first the time detailed studies of an atmospheric phenomenon known as runaway breakdown. In 2014, Dwyer left the Florida Institute of Technology and joined the University of New Hampshire.

== Research ==
In 2002 Dwyer, along with colleagues from Florida Institute of Technology and the University of Florida, launched rockets during thunderstorms at a facility now known as the UF/Florida Tech International Center for Lightning Research and Testing (ICLRT) at Camp Blanding, Florida. Using a heavily shielded instrument containing a scintillation detector, built by Dwyer and his students, they found that lightning does indeed produce x-rays and that x-ray emission is common for lightning. This research was published in Science (Dwyer et al. 2003). Since that time, Dwyer and his collaborators have established many key properties of the x-ray emissions from lightning, including the fact that the x-ray emission is produced during the lightning stepping process, has energies up to approximately 1 MeV and the x-rays are produced in the high field regions generated by the leader as it propagates. In 2005 TERA (Thunderstorm Energetic Radiation Array), a 24 detector array, was built to continue measuring x-rays and gamma-rays from lightning and to further study the x-ray characteristics that are associated with thunderstorms. Also, in 2005, Dwyer and collaborators made the surprising discovery that long laboratory sparks in air also generate x-rays similar to lightning, which has since motivated many groups around the world to study the x-ray emissions from sparks. Most recently, Dwyer and his team have built and deployed an x-ray camera at the ICLRT and have made the world's first x-ray images of lightning. Dwyer also has made several important theoretical contributions to the newly developing field of High Energy Atmospheric Physics, including work on runaway electron or runaway breakdown physics, gamma-ray and radio frequency emissions or atmospheric noise, and lightning initiation. In 2003, he introduced the Relativistic Feedback Mechanism of relativistic-runaway-electron avalanches, a new discharge mechanism in air, which explains how thunderclouds may generate very large flashes of gamma-rays called terrestrial gamma-ray flashes (TGFs). This work also showed the importance of positrons (anti-electrons) for thundercloud electrodynamics. Working with David Smith from UCSC he also helped establish that TGFs originate from deep within our atmosphere and not at high altitudes as had been previously assumed. Indeed, Dwyer and his team observed a ground level TGF at Camp Blanding in 2004. Finally, using BATSE data from the Compton Gamma-ray Observatory, Dwyer and collaborators discovered Terrestrial Electron Beams (TEBs) in the inner magnetosphere, which are generated by the high energy emissions from thunderstorms.

== Achievements ==
Dwyer has written and/or co-authored over 100 scientific research papers, more than 40 of them on lightning, terrestrial gamma-ray flashes, and x-rays from lightning. He has provided content to the PBS/NOVA website on lightning. He has spoken at many university colloquia, conferences, and workshops on his work. His work has also appeared on multiple documentaries, including Nova ScienceNow, Discovery Channel, the weather channel and BBC. Dwyer is the director of the Geospace Physics Lab at Florida Institute of Technology, advisor of graduate students, a member of the American Geophysical Union, and helps Florida Institute of Technology jointly operate the International Center for Lightning Research and Testing with the University of Florida lightning research group.

Dwyer was named a Fellow of the American Geophysical Union in 2019.

== See also ==
- List of physicists
- List of people from Florida
- List of University of Chicago alumni
