= Joseph Dwyer =

Joseph Dwyer may refer to:

- Joseph Dwyer (physicist) (born 1963), American physicist
- Joseph Dwyer (engineer) (1939–2021), British civil engineer and businessman
- Joseph Wilfrid Dwyer (1869–1939), Australian bishop
- Joe Dwyer (1903–1992), baseball player
- Joseph Patrick Dwyer (1976–2008), American soldier
- Joseph Dwyer (American football) (died 1968), American football coach
- Joseph Dwyer, a character in the 1988 film 555
