= Capacitively coupled plasma =

Type of industrial plasma source

A capacitively coupled plasma (CCP) is one of the most common types of industrial plasma sources. It essentially consists of two metal electrodes separated by a small distance, placed in a reactor. The gas pressure in the reactor can be lower than atmosphere or it can be atmospheric.

== Description ==
A typical CCP system is driven by a single radio-frequency (RF) power supply, typically at 13.56 MHz. One of two electrodes is connected to the power supply, and the other one is grounded. As this configuration is similar in principle to a capacitor in an electric circuit, the plasma formed in this configuration is called a capacitively coupled plasma.

When an electric field is generated between electrodes, atoms are ionized and release electrons. The electrons in the gas are accelerated by the RF field and can ionize the gas directly or indirectly by collisions, producing secondary electrons. When the electric field is strong enough, it can lead to what is known as electron avalanche. After avalanche breakdown, the gas becomes electrically conductive due to abundant free electrons. Often it accompanies light emission from excited atoms or molecules in the gas. When visible light is produced, plasma generation can be indirectly observed even with the naked eye.

A variation on capacitively coupled plasma involves isolating one of the electrodes, usually with a capacitor. The capacitor acts like a short circuit to the high frequency RF field, but like an open circuit to direct current (DC) field. Electrons impinge on the electrode in the sheath, and the electrode quickly acquires a negative charge (or self-bias) because the capacitor does not allow it to discharge to ground. This sets up a secondary, DC field across the plasma in addition to the alternating current (AC) field. Massive ions are unable to react to the quickly changing AC field, but the strong, persistent DC field accelerates them toward the self-biased electrode. These energetic ions are exploited in many microfabrication processes (see reactive-ion etching (RIE)) by placing a substrate on the isolated (self-biased) electrode.

Capacitively coupled plasmas have wide applications in the semiconductor processing industry for thin film deposition (see sputtering, plasma-enhanced chemical vapor deposition (PECVD)) and etching.

== See also ==
- Inductively coupled plasma
- Multipactor effect
- Plasma etching
