= John Paul Verboncoeur =

American electrical engineer and plasma physicist

- Education: University of Florida (BS); University of California, Berkeley (MS, PhD)
- Known for: Particle-in-cell Monte Carlo plasma simulation codes
- Awards: IEEE Fellow (2013); IEEE NPSS Richard F. Shea Distinguished Member Award (2018); IEEE NPSS Charles K. Birdsall Award (2022)
- Scientific career
- Fields: Computational plasma physics Electrical engineering
- Workplaces: Michigan State University; University of California, Berkeley; Lawrence Livermore National Laboratory
- Thesis: (1992)

John Paul Verboncoeur is an American electrical engineer and computational plasma physicist. He is a professor of electrical and computer engineering and of computational mathematics, science, and engineering at Michigan State University, where he also serves as senior associate dean for research and graduate studies in the College of Engineering. He was elected a Fellow of the Institute of Electrical and Electronics Engineers (IEEE) in 2013 for contributions to computational plasma physics and plasma device applications.

Verboncoeur is the author and coauthor of the MSU (formerly Berkeley) suite of particle-in-cell Monte Carlo (PIC-MC) plasma simulation codes, including XPDP1 and XOOPIC, which have been used by more than 1,000 researchers worldwide. He has served in senior leadership roles within the IEEE, including as president of the IEEE Nuclear and Plasma Sciences Society (2015–2016), IEEE Division IV director (2019–2020), and vice president of IEEE Technical Activities (2023).

== Education and early career ==
Verboncoeur received a Bachelor of Science with high honours in engineering science from the University of Florida in 1986. He received a Master of Science in 1987 and a PhD in 1992, both in nuclear engineering from the University of California, Berkeley, as a recipient of the U.S. Department of Energy Magnetic Fusion Energy Technology Fellowship.

After completing his doctorate, Verboncoeur held a joint postdoctoral appointment at Lawrence Livermore National Laboratory and UC Berkeley in the Department of Electrical Engineering and Computer Science. He was subsequently appointed associate research engineer in Berkeley's EECS department. In 2001, he joined the UC Berkeley nuclear engineering faculty, and attained the rank of full professor in 2008. While at Berkeley, he cofounded and chaired the Computational Engineering Science Program from 2001 to 2010.

== Career at Michigan State University ==
In 2011, Verboncoeur was appointed professor of electrical and computer engineering at Michigan State University. In 2015, he cofounded the MSU Department of Computational Mathematics, Science, and Engineering and was named a professor in the new department. He was appointed associate dean for research and graduate studies in the College of Engineering in 2014, later becoming senior associate dean.

At MSU, Verboncoeur leads the Plasma Theory and Simulation Group, which develops theoretical and computational tools for plasma physics. His research interests span computational plasma physics, electromagnetics, beam physics, high-field effects such as multipactor and breakdown, laser–plasma interactions, and numerical methods. Applications of his work include microwave-beam devices, particle accelerators, fusion energy, plasma thrusters, and plasma processing.

== Research ==
Verboncoeur's principal contribution is the development and distribution of the MSU (formerly Berkeley) suite of particle-in-cell Monte Carlo codes for plasma simulation. The suite includes XPDP1, a one-dimensional planar electrostatic particle-in-cell code with external circuit and Monte Carlo collision modelling, and XOOPIC, a two-dimensional electromagnetic PIC-MC code with flexible coordinate systems and boundary conditions. These freely distributed codes have been used in more than 450 journal publications by researchers worldwide.

Among Verboncoeur's technical innovations are the first self-consistent model for plasmas bounded by electrodes connected to real driving circuits, the first interactive graphical user interface for plasma simulations, and the first object-oriented plasma model. His group also developed the first time-dependent explanation of the transition of multipactor breakdown to gaseous discharge, as well as a novel kinetic global model.

He has authored or coauthored more than 500 journal articles and conference papers, with over 6,800 citations, and has taught 15 international workshops and mini-courses on plasma simulation. He serves as an associate editor for Physics of Plasmas.

== IEEE service ==
Verboncoeur has held a series of leadership positions within the Institute of Electrical and Electronics Engineers:

- President, IEEE Nuclear and Plasma Sciences Society (2015–2016)
- IEEE Division IV Director (2019–2020)
- Acting Vice President, IEEE Publications, Services, and Products Board (2020)
- Vice President, IEEE Technical Activities (2023)

He was a candidate for 2025 IEEE president-elect.

== Other service ==
Verboncoeur serves on the U.S. Department of Energy Fusion Energy Sciences Advisory Committee and the board of directors of the American Center for Mobility, a national proving ground for autonomous vehicle testing in Ypsilanti, Michigan.

== Awards and honours ==
- 2013 – IEEE Fellow, "for contributions to computational plasma physics and plasma device applications"
- 2018 – IEEE NPSS Richard F. Shea Distinguished Member Award
- 2019 – IEEE NPSS Plasma Science and Applications Committee Award
- 2022 – IEEE NPSS Charles K. Birdsall Award, "for pioneering leadership in computational plasma science research, education, student mentoring, curriculum innovation, supportive professional community leadership, and helping to define the field of computational plasma physics"

== Selected publications ==
- Verboncoeur, J.P.; Alves, M.V.; Vahedi, V.; Birdsall, C.K. (February 1993). "Simultaneous Potential and Circuit Solution for 1D Bounded Plasma Particle Simulation Codes". Journal of Computational Physics. 104 (2): 321–328. Bibcode:1993JCoPh.104..321V. doi:10.1006/jcph.1993.1034.
- Verboncoeur, J.P.; Langdon, A.B.; Gladd, N.T. (May 1995). "An Object-Oriented Electromagnetic PIC Code". Computer Physics Communications. 87 (1–2): 199–211. Bibcode:1995CoPhC..87..199V. doi:10.1016/0010-4655(94)00173-Y.
- Verboncoeur, J.P. (2005). "Particle Simulation of Plasmas: Review and Advances". Plasma Physics and Controlled Fusion. 47 (5A): A231–A260. Bibcode:2005PPCF...47A.231V. doi:10.1088/0741-3335/47/5A/017.
