= Surface Science Reports =

- Discipline: Materials science
- Language: English
- Edited by: C. T. Campbell

Publication details
- History: 1981–present
- Publisher: North-Holland
- Frequency: Monthly
- Impact factor: 11.6 (2025)

Standard abbreviations
- ISO 4: Surf. Sci. Rep.

Indexing
- CODEN: SSREDI
- ISSN: 0167-5729
- LCCN: 92645771
- OCLC no.: 07969615

Links
- Journal homepage; Online access

Surface Science Reports is a peer-reviewed scientific journal published by North-Holland that covers the physics and chemistry of surfaces. It was established in 1981. It is the review journal corresponding to the journals Surface Science and Surface Science Letters.

== Abstracting and indexing ==
This journal is abstracted and indexed by:

- Aluminium Industry Abstracts
- Chemical Abstracts Service
- Current Contents/Physics, Chemical, & Earth Sciences
- EI-Compendex
- Engineered Materials Abstracts
- Inspec
- Metals Abstracts
- Science Citation Index
- Scopus
- Applied Science and Technology Abstracts

According to the Journal Citation Reports, Surface Science Reports has a 2025 impact factor of 11.6.
