= Clement D. Child =

American physicist and educator (1868-1933)

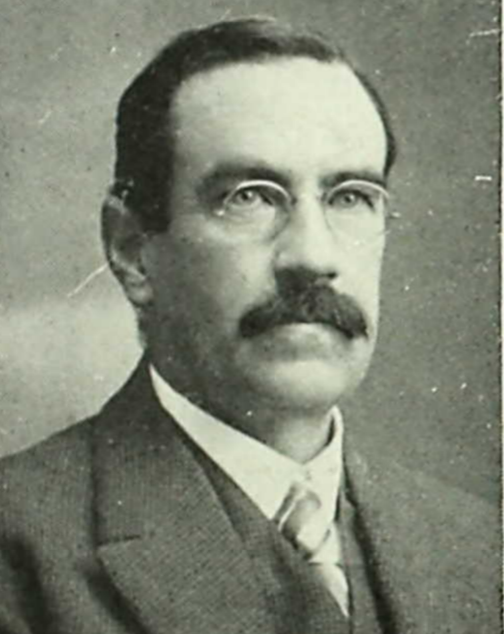
- Born: Clement Dexter Child; May 15, 1868; Madison, Ohio
- Died: July 15, 1933 (aged 65); Rochester, New York
- Education: University of Rochester; Cornell University
- Known for: Child's law
- Scientific career
- Workplaces: Colgate University

Clement D. Child (1868 – 1933) was an American physicist and educator. He is noted particularly for "Child's law" (1911), which is an equation that describes the electric current that flows between the plates of a vacuum tube. Vacuum tubes were the main components in electronics from about 1905 to 1960, when transistors and integrated circuits mostly supplanted them. Child's Law is still a staple of textbooks treating charged particle motion in vacuum and in solids.

Child was raised in Frewsburg, New York, where his father was a Baptist pastor. He received an A. B. degree from the University of Rochester (in Rochester, New York) in 1890. In 1897, he received a Ph.D. from Cornell University in Ithaca, New York. In 1897 he was a scientific visitor at the University of Berlin in Germany. In 1898 he was appointed a professor of physics at Colgate University in Hamilton, New York, where he spent the rest of his career. In 1907–08 he was a visitor to the Cavendish Laboratory in Cambridge, England, where he worked with J. J. Thomson. He published a book Electric Arcs in 1913. Between 1895 and 1933 Child published 28 papers in Physical Review, which was perhaps the principal US physics journal in that era.

The equation known as "Child's Law" describes the electric current between two metal plates in a vacuum tube; the current flows when a power supply applies a voltage between the plates. One plate, the cathode, is heated hot enough that it will emit electrons well. The second plate, the anode, is unheated. When the voltage between the anode and the cathode is positive, the negatively charged electrons are attracted to the anode. They fly through the vacuum, and are registered as the electric current drawn from the power supply. When the voltage is negative, the electrons are repelled by the anode, and the current is essentially zero. Child's law predicted the current at lower positive voltages, at which the current isn't limited by the electron emission process. Rather, a cloud of electrons forms near the cathode and limits the current. Child showed that this current was proportional to the voltage raised to 3/2 power (V^{3/2}). The current only depends on the properties of the electron through the ratio of the electrical charge of the electron to its mass.

Although Child's Law is usually used to describe electron currents, Child actually derived the equation in order to estimate the current of positively charged atomic ions. The only change is that charge to mass ratios for ions are much smaller than for the electron. The application to electrons was made in 1913 by Irving Langmuir, and the equation is also called the Child-Langmuir Law because of this. Child's original paper was cited in scientific papers more than 600 times in the century following its publication; in 2013, the paper was cited 32 times.
