= Raether limit =

Maximum possible gain in a Townsend avalanche

The Raether limit is the physical limiting value of the multiplication factor (M) or gas gain in an ionization avalanche process (Townsend avalanche).

Even though, theoretically, it seems as if M can increase without limit (exponentially), physically, it is limited to about M < 10^{8} or αx < 20 (where α is the first Townsend coefficient and x is the length of the path of ionization, starting from the point of the primary ionization).

Heinz Raether postulated that this was due to the effect of the space charge on the electric field.

The multiplication factor or gas gain is of fundamental importance for the operation of the proportional counter and Geiger counter ionizing radiation detectors.

== Sources ==
- The Mechanism of the Electric Spark, Leonard Benedict Loeb, John M. Meek. Stanford University Press, 1941
- High Voltage Engineering, M S Naidu, V Kamarju. Tata McGraw-Hill Education, 2009
