= Runaway breakdown =

Theory of lightning initiation

Runaway breakdown is a theory of lightning initiation proposed by Alex Gurevich in 1992.

Electrons in air have a mean free path of ~1 cm. Fast electrons which move at a large fraction of the speed of light have a mean free path up to 100 times longer. Given the longer free paths, an electric field can accelerate these electrons to energies far higher than those of initially static electrons. If they strike air molecules, more relativistic electrons will be released, creating an avalanche multiplication of "runaway" electrons. This process, called the relativistic runaway electron avalanche, has been hypothesized to lead to electrical breakdown in thunderstorms, but only when a source of high-energy electrons from a cosmic ray is present to start the "runaway" process.

The resulting conductive plasma trail, many tens of meters long, is suggested to supply the "seed" which triggers a lightning flash.

== See also ==
- Spark gap
- Avalanche breakdown
- Electron avalanche
