= Spark chamber =

Charged particle detector

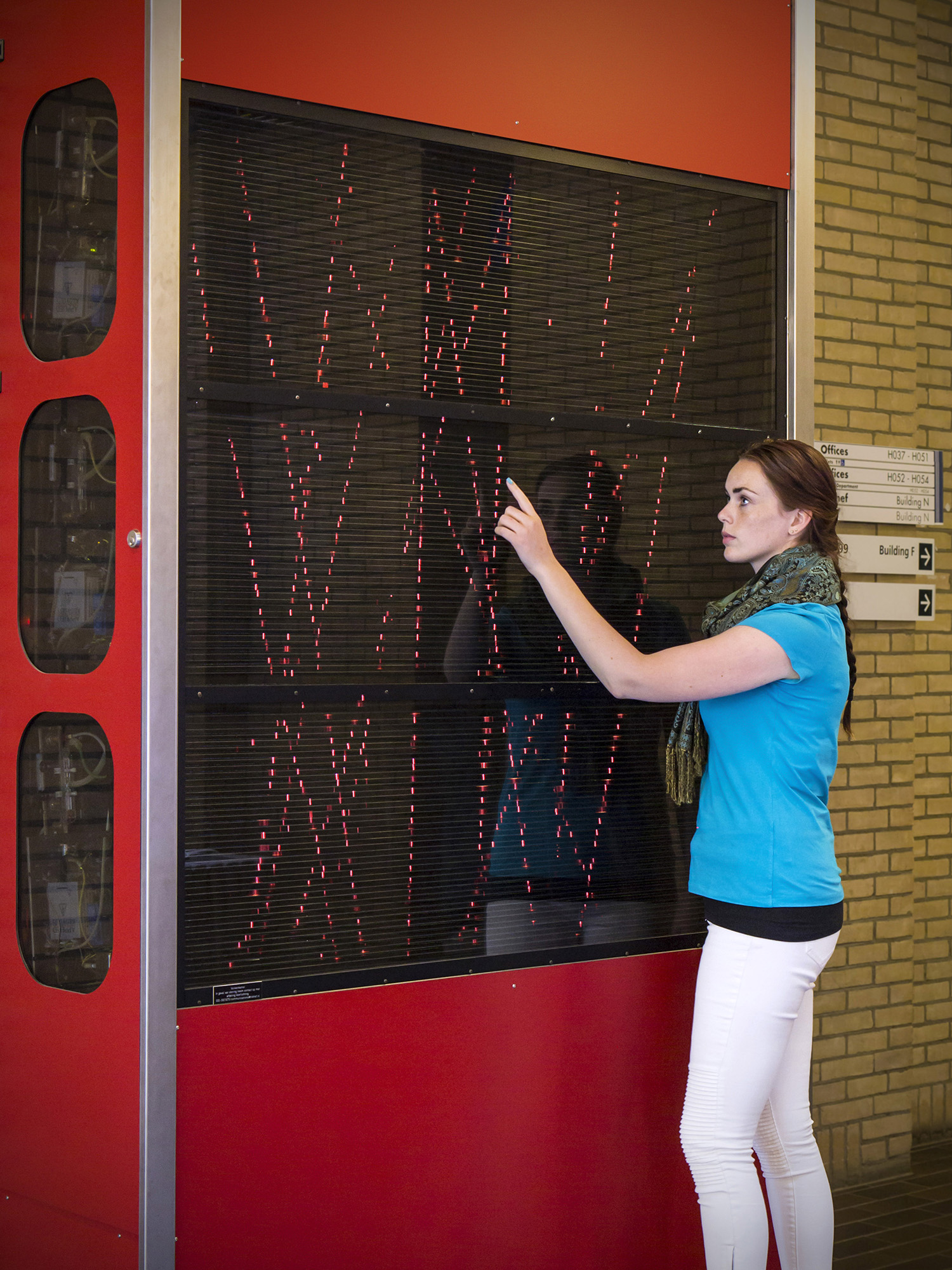
Spark chamber demonstration

A spark chamber is a particle detector: a device used in particle physics for detecting electrically charged particles. They were most widely used as research tools from the 1930s to the 1960s and have since been superseded by other technologies such as drift chambers and silicon detectors. Today, working spark chambers are mostly found in science museums and educational organisations, where they are used to demonstrate aspects of particle physics and astrophysics.

In 1949, Jack Warren Keuffel, working on Geiger–Müller counters with parallel-plate geometry, observed that discharge between parallel plates occurred along the path of cosmic rays and pointed out a possible use case for particle tracking. In 1953, F. Bella and C. Franzinetti, published the first photographs of the spark discharge. Paul-Gerhard Henning, took stereo photographs and introduced the use of many parallel plate counters and strengthening the spark with a coincidence-triggered condenser discharge (1955). Two years later, T. E. Cranshaw and J. F. DeBeer, developed the chamber to make use of air at atmospheric pressure and achieve efficiencies reaching 99%, paving the way for their use high-energy physics as well as cosmic-ray physics.

Spark chambers consist of a stack of metal plates placed in a sealed box filled with a gas such as helium, neon or a mixture of the two. When a charged particle, for instance a cosmic ray, travels through the box, it ionises the gas between the plates. Ordinarily this ionisation would remain invisible. However, if a high enough voltage can be applied between each adjacent pair of plates before that ionisation disappears, then sparks can be made to form along the trajectory taken by the particle, in effect becoming visible as a line of sparks. In order to control when this voltage is applied, a separate detector (often containing a pair of scintillators or other Geiger tubes placed above and below the box) is needed. When this trigger senses that a cosmic ray has just passed, it fires a fast switch to connect the high voltage to the plates. The high voltage cannot be connected to the plates permanently, as this would lead to arc formation and continuous discharging.

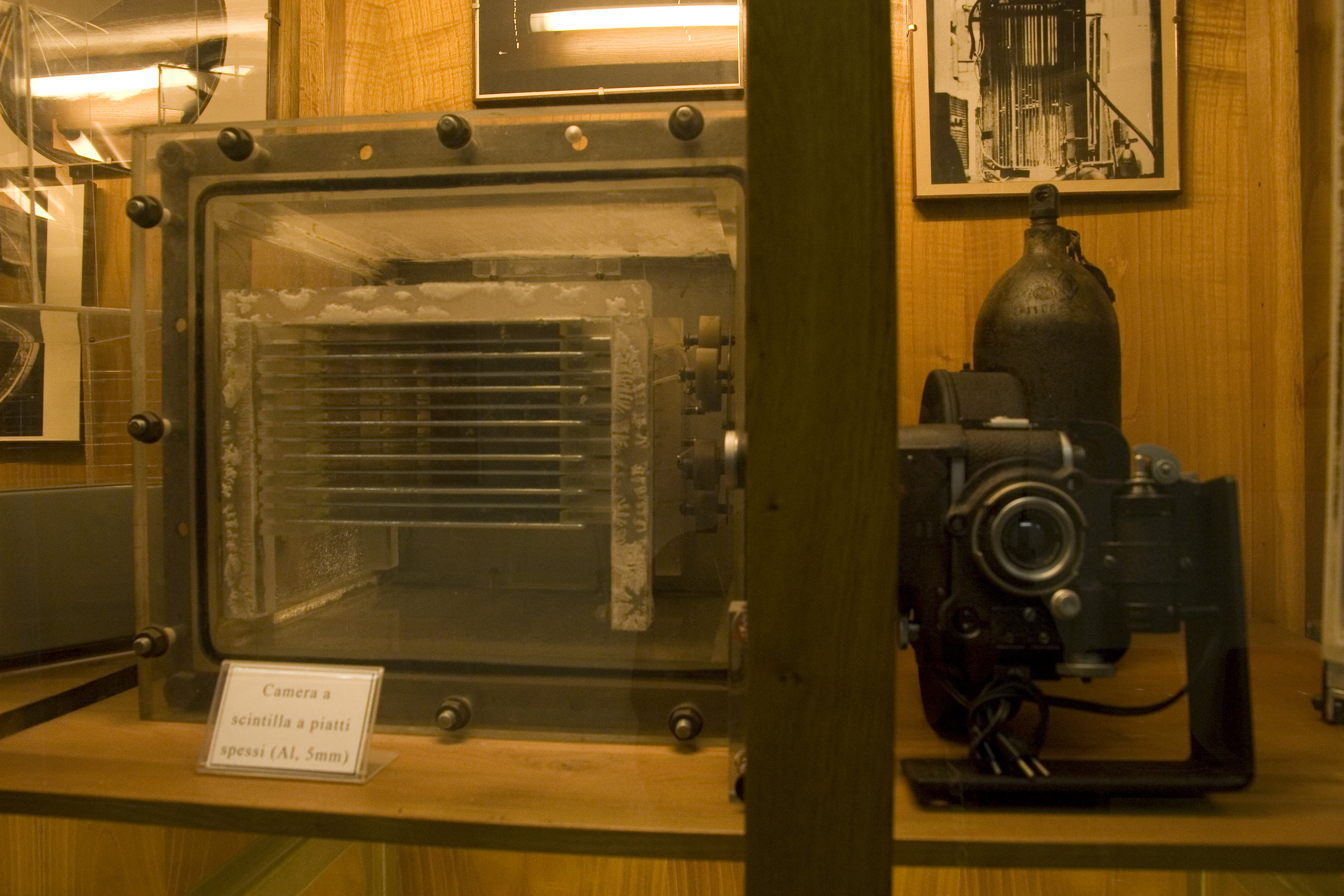
A spark chamber at the physics museum of the Sapienza University of Rome

As research devices, spark chamber detectors have lower resolution than bubble chamber detectors. However they could be made highly selective with the help of auxiliary detectors, making them useful in searching for very rare events. For instance, a spark chamber was chosen instead of a bubble chamber for the experiment that led to the discovery of the muon neutrino in 1962, an achievement that was later recognized with the 1988 Nobel Prize in Physics.

== Related devices ==
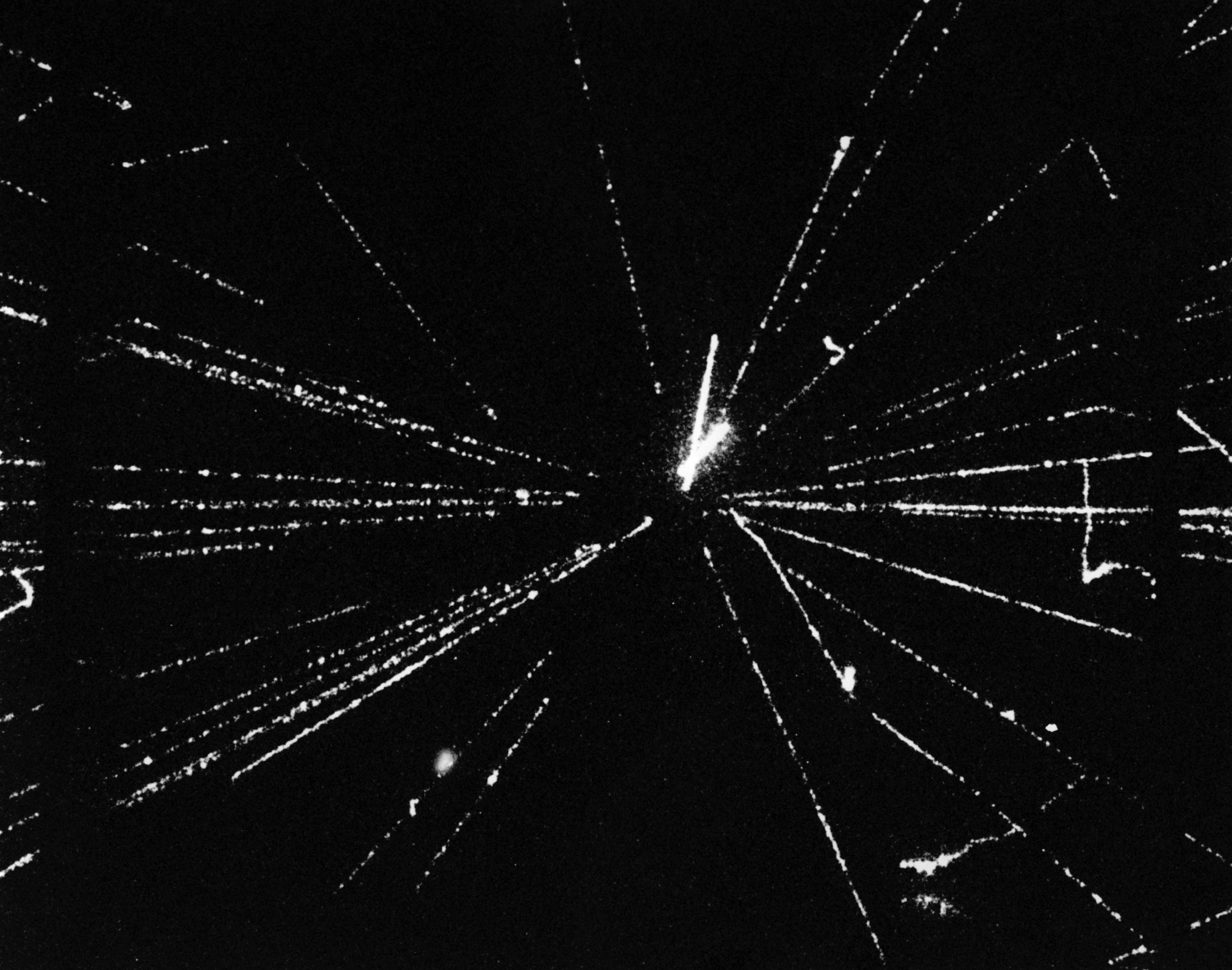
A proton–antiproton collision recorded using a streamer chamber in the UA5 experiment at CERN

A streamer chamber is a type of detector closely related to the spark chamber. In a spark chamber one looks at a stack of parallel plates edge-on. For this reason, best viewing is afforded when the particle comes in perpendicularly to the plates. A streamer chamber, in contrast, typically has only two plates, at least one of which is transparent (e.g. wire mesh or a conductive glass). Particles come in roughly parallel to the plane of these plates. A much shorter high-voltage pulse is used than with a spark chamber, so there is insufficient time for sparks to form. Instead very dim streamers of ionised gas are formed. These can be seen when image enhancement is applied.

== See also ==
- Electric spark
- Cloud chamber
- Bubble chamber
