= Leader (spark) =

Hot, conductive channel of plasma

In electromagnetism, a leader is a hot, highly conductive channel of plasma that plays a critical part during dielectric breakdown within a long electric spark.

== Mechanism ==
When a gas is subjected to high voltage stress, the electric field is often quite non-uniform near one, or both, of the high voltage electrodes making up a spark gap. Breakdown initially begins with the formation of corona discharges near the electrode with the highest electrical stress. If the electrical field is further increased, longer length cold discharges (called streamers or burst corona) sporadically form near the stressed electrode. Streamers attract multiple electron avalanches into a single channel, propagating forward quickly via photon emission which leads to photoelectrons producing new avalanches. Streamers redistribute charge within the surrounding gas, temporarily forming regions of excess charge (space charges) in the regions surrounding the discharges.

If the electrical field is sufficiently high, the individual currents from multitudes of streamers combine to create a hot, highly conductive path that projects from the electrode, going some distance into the gap. The projecting channel of hot plasma is called a leader, and it can have an electrical conductivity approaching that of an electric arc. The leader effectively projects the electrical field from the nearby electrode further into the gap, similar to introducing a short length of wire into the gap. The tip of the conductive leader now forms a new region from which streamers can extend even further into the gap. As new streamer discharges feed the tip of the leader, the streamer currents help to keep the leader hot and conductive. Under sufficiently high voltages, the leader will continue to extend itself further into the gap, doing so in a series of jumps until the entire gap has been bridged. Although leaders are most often associated with the initial formative stages of a lightning stroke, they are characteristic of the development of all long sparks. In the case of a lightning leader, each extension (called a step leader) is typically 10 – 50 meters in length. The blue-white branching discharges from a Tesla Coil are also examples of leaders.

== See also ==
- Lightning
- Breakdown voltage
- Electron avalanche
