= Multipactor effect =

The multipactor effect is a phenomenon in radio-frequency (RF) amplifier vacuum tubes and waveguides, where, under certain conditions, secondary electron emission in resonance with an alternating electromagnetic field leads to exponential electron multiplication, possibly damaging and even destroying the RF device.

== Description ==
Simulation of coxial multipactor. The electron cloud moves between the inner and outer conductor in resonance, causing an electron avalanche: in 5 nanoseconds, the number of electrons increases 150×.

The multipactor effect occurs when electrons accelerated by radio-frequency (RF) fields are self-sustained in a vacuum (or near vacuum) via an electron avalanche caused by secondary electron emission. The impact of an electron to a surface can, depending on its energy and angle, release one or more secondary electrons into the vacuum. These electrons can then be accelerated by the RF fields and impact with the same or another surface. Should the impact energies, number of electrons released, and timing of the impacts be such that a sustained multiplication of the number of electrons occurs, the phenomenon can grow exponentially and may lead to operational problems of the RF system such as damage of RF components or loss or distortion of the RF signal.

== Mechanism ==
The mechanism of multipactor depends on the orientation of an RF electric field with respect to the surface as well as the magnetic field and its orientation. There are two types of multipactor: two-surface multipactor on metals and single-surface multipactor on metal or dielectrics.

=== Two-surface multipactor on metals ===
This is a multipactor effect that occurs in the gap between metallic electrodes. Often, an RF electric field is normal to the surface. A resonance between electron flight time and RF field cycle is a mechanism for multipactor development.

The existence of multipactor is dependent on the following three conditions being met: The average number of electrons released is greater than or equal to one per incident electron (this is dependent on the secondary electron yield of the surface), and the time taken by the electron to travel from the surface from which it was released to the surface it impacts is an integer multiple of one half of the RF period, and the average secondary electron yield is greater than or equal to one.

=== Single-surface multipactor ===
The multipactor effect can take place on a single surface when magnetic fields are taken into account. A single-surface multipactor event is also possible on a metallic surface in the presence of a crossed static magnetic field. It may also occur on a dielectric surface, where often an RF electric field is parallel to the surface. The positive charge accumulated on the dielectric surface attracts electrons back to the surface.

== Frequency-gap product in two-surface multipactor ==
The conditions under which multipactor will occur in two surface multipactor can be described by a quantity called the frequency-gap product. Consider a two surface setup with the following definitions:

$d$, distance or gap between the surfaces
$\omega$, angular frequency of the RF field
$V_0$, peak plate-to-plate RF voltage
$E_0$, peak electric field between the surfaces, equal to $V_0$/$d$.

The RF voltage varies sinusoidally. Consider the time at which the voltage at electrode A passes through 0 and starts to become negative. Assuming that there is at least 1 free electron near A, that electron will begin to accelerate to the right toward electrode B. It will continue to accelerate and reach a maximum velocity half a cycle later, just as the voltage at electrode B begins to become negative. If the electron(s) from electrode A strike electrode B at this time and produce additional free electrons, these new free electrons will begin to accelerate toward electrode A. The process may then repeat causing multipactor. We now find the relationship between the plate spacing, RF frequency, and RF voltage that causes the strongest multipactor resonance.

Consider a point in time at which electrons have just collided with electrode A at position -d/2. The electric field is at zero and is beginning to point to the left so that the newly freed electrons are accelerated toward the right. Newton's equation of motion of the free electrons is

$$a(t)=\frac{F(t)}{m}$$
$$\ddot{x}(t) = \frac{qE_0}{m}~\sin(\omega t)$$

The solution to this differential equation is

$$x(t) = -\frac{qE_0}{m \omega^2}\sin(\omega t) + \frac{qE_0}{m \omega}t - \frac{d}{2}$$

where it is assumed that when the electrons initially leave the electrode they have zero velocity. We know that resonance happens if the electrons arrive at the rightmost electrode after one half of the period of the RF field, $t_{\frac{1}{2}}=\frac{\pi}{\omega}$. Plugging this into our solution for $x(t)$ we get

$$x(t_{\frac{1}{2}}) = -\frac{qE_0}{m \omega^2}\sin(\omega t_{\frac{1}{2}}) + \frac{qE_0}{m \omega} t_{\frac{1}{2}} - \frac{d}{2}$$
$$\frac{d}{2} = -\frac{qE_0}{m \omega^2}\sin(\omega \frac{\pi}{\omega}) + \frac{qE_0}{m \omega} \frac{\pi}{\omega} - \frac{d}{2}$$

Rearranging and using the frequency $f$ instead of the angular frequency gives

$$fd = \frac{1}{2\sqrt\pi}\sqrt \frac{qV_0}{m}$$.

The product $fd$ is called the frequency-gap product. Keep in mind that this equation is a criterion for greatest amount of resonance, but multipactor can still occur when this equation is not satisfied.

== Effects of geometry ==
Multipacting depends on the geometry of the surface and the exact distribution of the electric and magnetic fields. There are a number of geometry-based techniques to reduce or even eliminate the multipactor effect: One is through small-scale grooves which modify the direction of the electric fields exactly at the location of the electron emission, thereby kicking some of the electrons to directions that do not support the process. Another approach is through large scale corrugations of the surface which periodically alter the time of flight of the electrons in two-point multipacting, thereby disrupting the multipactor resonance condition Then there are specific changes in the curvature of a cavity's surface that spoil the chances of the electrons to return to the point of origin or cavity-beam pipe transition surface. These various surface modifications techniques provide a powerful tool for the suppression of multipacting in various geometries.

== History ==
This phenomenon was first observed by the French physicist Camille Gutton, in 1924, at Nancy.

Multipactor was identified and studied in 1934 by Philo Farnsworth, the inventor of electronic television, who attempted to take advantage of it as an amplifier. More commonly nowadays, it has become an obstacle to be avoided for normal operation of particle accelerators, vacuum electronics, radars, satellite communication devices, and so forth.

The first application of computers to investigate multipacting is from the early 1970s when it was discovered as a major SRF cavity performance limitation.

A novel form of multipactor has been proposed, and subsequently experimentally observed, in which charging of a dielectric surface considerably changes the dynamics of the multipactor discharge.

== See also ==
- Capacitively coupled plasma
- Inductively coupled plasma

== See also ==
- Capacitively coupled plasma
- Electron avalanche
- Fusor
