= Electron avalanche =

Process in electrical breakdown

An electron avalanche is a process in which a number of free electrons in a transmission medium are subjected to strong acceleration by an electric field and subsequently collide with other atoms of the medium, thereby ionizing them (impact ionization). This releases additional electrons which accelerate and collide with further atoms, releasing more electrons—a chain reaction. In a gas, this causes the affected region to become an electrically conductive plasma.

The avalanche effect was discovered by John Sealy Townsend in his work between 1897 and 1901, and is also known as the Townsend discharge.

Electron avalanches are essential to the dielectric breakdown process within gases. The process can culminate in corona discharges, streamers, leaders, or in a spark or continuous arc that completely bridges the gap between the electrical conductors that are applying the voltage. The process extends to huge sparks — streamers in lightning discharges propagate by formation of electron avalanches created in the high potential gradient ahead of the streamers' advancing tips. Once begun, avalanches are often intensified by the creation of photoelectrons as a result of ultraviolet radiation emitted by the excited medium's atoms in the aft-tip region.

The process can also be used to detect ionizing radiation by using the gas multiplication effect of the avalanche process. This is the ionisation mechanism of the Geiger–Müller tube and, to a limited extent, of the proportional counter and is also used in spark chambers and other wire chambers.

== Analysis ==
A plasma begins with a rare natural 'background' ionization event of a neutral air molecule, perhaps as the result of photoexcitation or background radiation. If this event occurs within an area that has a high potential gradient, the positively charged ion will be strongly attracted toward, or repelled away from, an electrode depending on its polarity, whereas the electron will be accelerated in the opposite direction. Because of the huge mass difference, electrons are accelerated to a much higher velocity than ions.

High-velocity electrons often collide with neutral atoms inelastically, sometimes ionizing them. In a chain-reaction — or an 'electron avalanche' — additional electrons recently separated from their positive ions by the strong potential gradient, cause a large cloud of electrons and positive ions to be momentarily generated by just a single initial electron. However, free electrons are easily captured by neutral oxygen or water vapor molecules (so-called electronegative gases), forming negative ions. In air at STP, free electrons exist for only about 11 nanoseconds before being captured. Captured electrons are effectively removed from play — they can no longer contribute to the avalanche process. If electrons are being created at a rate greater than they are being lost to capture, their number rapidly multiplies, a process characterized by exponential growth. The degree of multiplication that this process can provide is huge, up to several million-fold depending on the situation. The multiplication factor M is given by

$$M = \frac{1}{1-\int_{X_1}^{X_2} \alpha\, dx}$$

Where X_{1} and X_{2} are the positions that the multiplication is being measured between, and α is the ionization constant. In other words, one free electron at position X_{1} will result in M free electrons at position X_{2}. Substituting the voltage gradients into this equation results in

$$M = \frac{1}{1 - \left|V / V_\mathrm{BR}\right|^n}$$

Where V is the applied voltage, V_{BR} is the breakdown voltage and n is an empirically derived value between 2 and 6. As can be seen from this formula, the multiplication factor is very highly dependent on the applied voltage, and as the voltage nears the breakdown voltage of the material, the multiplication factor approaches infinity and the limiting factor becomes the availability of charge carriers.

Avalanche sustenance requires a reservoir of charge to sustain the applied voltage, as well as a continual source of triggering events. A number of mechanisms can sustain this process, creating avalanche after avalanche, to create a corona current. A secondary source of plasma electrons is required as the electrons are always accelerated by the field in one direction, meaning that avalanches always proceed linearly toward or away from an electrode. The dominant mechanism for the creation of secondary electrons depends on the polarity of a plasma. In each case, the energy emitted as photons by the initial avalanche is used to ionise a nearby gas molecule creating another accelerable electron. What differs is the source of this electron. When one or more electron avalanches occur between two electrodes of sufficient size, complete avalanche breakdown can occur, culminating in an electrical spark that bridges the gap.

== See also ==
- Townsend discharge
- Avalanche breakdown
- Avalanche diode
- Corona discharge
- Multipactor
- Geiger–Müller tube
- Geiger counter
- Spark chamber
- Wire chamber
- Runaway breakdown
- Relativistic runaway electron avalanche
