= Aleksandr Gurevich =

Russian physicist (1930–2023)

Aleksandr Viktorovich Gurevich (Russian: Александр Викторович Гуревич; 19 September 1930 – 21 July 2023) was a Soviet and Russian physicist. In 1992 he proposed the theory of lightning initiation known as the "runaway breakdown".

Gurevich was born on 19 September 1930. He graduated from Moscow State University in 1952. In 1984 he became a Corresponding Member of the USSR Academy of Sciences (Russian Academy of Sciences since 1991). He was the head of the I. E. Tamm Theoretical Department at the Lebedev Physical Institute. From 2010 he was the head of Academic Department of Physics and Astrophysics Problems in Moscow Institute of Physics and Technology.

Aleksandr Gurevich died on 21 July 2023, at the age of 92.

== Fields of Research ==
His work has focused on:

- Plasma kinetics (1955-)
- Ionospheric physics (1955-)
- Nonlinear dynamics of non-collisional plasmas (1963-)
- Nonlinear waves in dispersive hydrodynamics (1973-)
- Artificial ionized layers in the atmosphere (1977-)
- The electrodynamics of neutron star magnetospheres (1983–1993)
- Nonlinear dynamics of dark matter (1988-)
