= Surface Science (journal) =

- Discipline: Materials science, physics
- Language: English
- Edited by: H-P. Steinrück

Publication details
- History: 1964-present
- Publisher: Elsevier
- Frequency: Monthly
- Impact factor: 1.942 (2020)

Standard abbreviations
- ISO 4: Surf. Sci.

Indexing
- CODEN: SUSCAS
- ISSN: 0039-6028
- LCCN: 64009351
- OCLC no.: 900974308

Links
- Journal homepage; Online access

Surface Science is a monthly peer-reviewed scientific journal published by Elsevier that covers the physics and chemistry of surfaces and interfaces. It was established in 1964. The journal encompasses Surface Science Letters, which was published separately until 1993.

The scope of the journal includes nanotechnology, catalysis, and soft matter and features both experimental and computational studies. Extended reviews are published in its companion journal, Surface Science Reports.

According to the Journal Citation Reports, the journal has a 2020 impact factor of 1.942.
