= Relativistic runaway electron avalanche =

Physical phenomenon

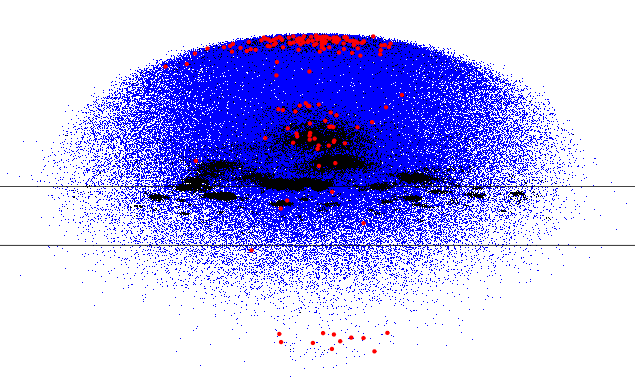
RREA simulation showing electrons (black), photons (blue), and positrons (red)

A relativistic runaway electron avalanche (RREA) is an avalanche growth of a population of relativistic electrons driven through a material (typically air) by an electric field. RREA has been hypothesized to be related to lightning initiation, terrestrial gamma-ray flashes, sprite lightning, and spark development. RREA is unique as it can occur at electric fields an order of magnitude lower than the dielectric strength of the material.

== Mechanism ==
Dynamic friction of free electrons in air compared to an applied electric field showing the runaway electron energy range

When an electric field is applied to a material, free electrons will drift slowly through the material as described by the electron mobility. For low-energy electrons, faster drift velocities result in more interactions with surrounding particles. These interactions create a form of friction that slow the electrons down. Thus, for low-energy cases, the electron velocities tend to stabilize.

At higher energies, above about 100 keV, these collisional events become less common as the mean free path of the electron rises. These higher-energy electrons thus see less frictional force as their velocity increases. In the presence of the same electric field, these electrons will continue accelerating, "running away".

As runaway electrons gain energy from an electric field, they occasionally collide with atoms in the material, knocking off secondary electrons. If the secondary electrons also have high-enough energy to run away, then they too accelerate to high energies, produce further secondary electrons, etc. As such, the total number of energetic electrons grows exponentially in an avalanche.

The dynamic friction function, shown in the Figure, takes into account only energy losses due to inelastic collisions and has a minimum of ~216 keV/cm at electron energy of ~1.23 MeV. More useful thresholds, however, must include also the effects due to electron momentum loss due to elastic collisions. In that case, an analytical estimate gives the runaway threshold of ~282 keV/cm, which occurs at the electron energy of ~7 MeV. This result approximately agrees with numbers obtained from Monte Carlo simulations, of ~284 keV/cm and 10 MeV, respectively.

== Seeding ==
The RREA mechanism above only describes the growth of the avalanche. An initial energetic electron is needed to start the process. In ambient air, such energetic electrons typically come from cosmic rays. In very strong electric fields, stronger than the maximum frictional force experienced by electrons, even low-energy ("cold" or "thermal") electrons can accelerate to relativistic energies, a process dubbed "thermal runaway".

== Feedback ==
RREA avalanches generally move opposite the direction of the electric field. As such, after the avalanches leave the electric field region, frictional forces dominate, the electrons lose energy, and the process stops. There is the possibility, however, that photons or positrons produced by the avalanche will wander back to where the avalanche began and can produce new seeds for a second generation of avalanches. If the electric field region is large enough, then the number of second-generation avalanches will exceed the number of first-generation avalanches, and the number of avalanches itself grows exponentially. This avalanche of avalanches can produce extremely large populations of energetic electrons. This process eventually leads to the decay of the electric field below the level at which feedback is possible and therefore acts as a limit to the large-scale electric field strength.

== Effects of RREA ==
The large population of energetic electrons produced in RREA will produce a correspondingly large population of energetic photons by bremsstrahlung. These photons are proposed as the source of terrestrial gamma-ray flashes. Large RREA events in thunderstorms may also contribute rare but large radiation doses to commercial airline flights. The American physicist Joseph Dwyer coined the term "dark lightning" for this phenomenon, which is still the subject of research.
