= Inductively coupled plasma =

Type of plasma source

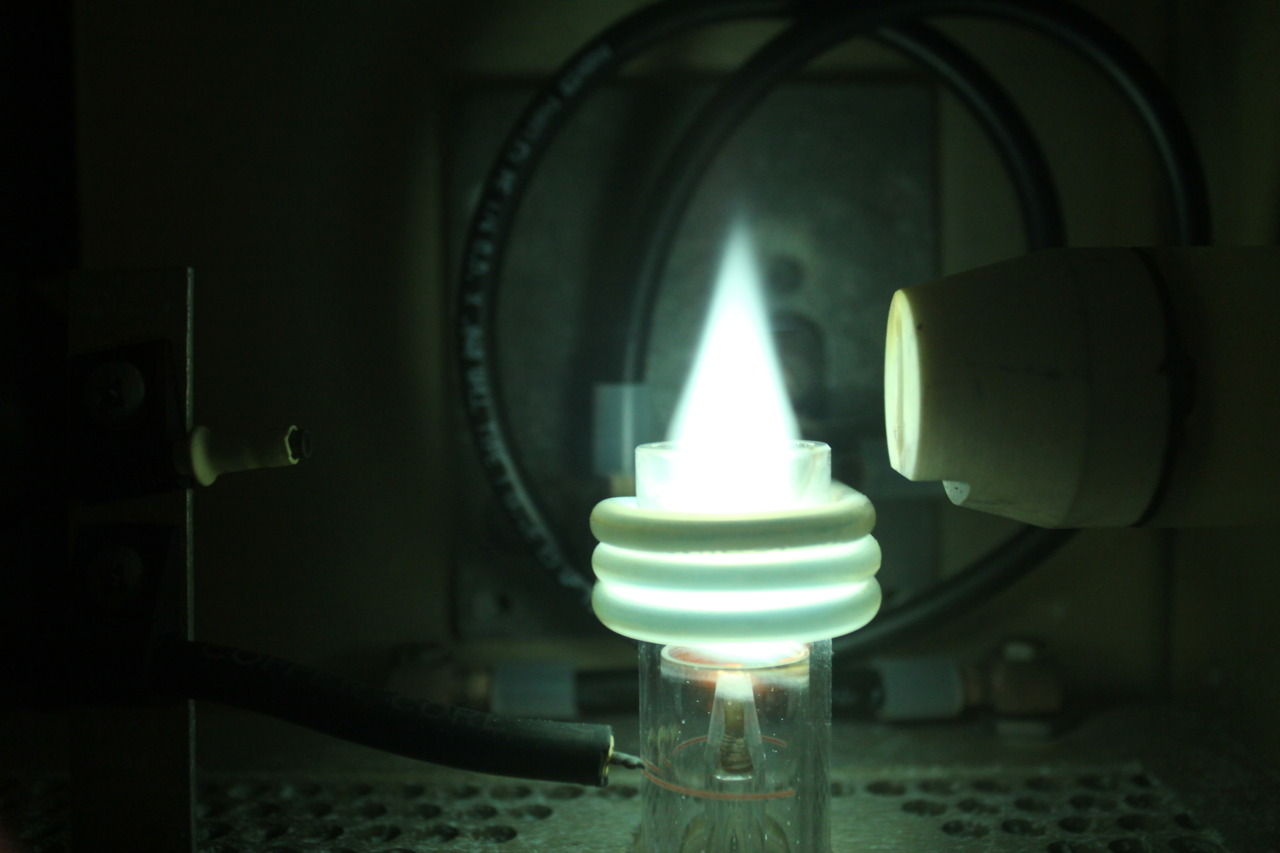
Fig. 1. Picture of an analytical ICP torch

An inductively coupled plasma (ICP) or transformer coupled plasma (TCP) is a type of plasma source in which the energy is supplied by electric currents which are produced by electromagnetic induction, that is, by time-varying magnetic fields.

== Operation ==
Fig. 2. The construction of an inductively coupled plasma torch. A: cooling gas tangential flow to the outer quartz tube B: discharge gas flow (usually Ar) C: flow of carrier gas with sample D: induction coil which forms the strong magnetic field inside the torch E: force vectors of the magnetic field F: the plasma torch (the discharge).

There are three types of ICP geometries: planar (Fig. 3 (a)), cylindrical (Fig. 3 (b)), and half-toroidal (Fig. 3 (c)).

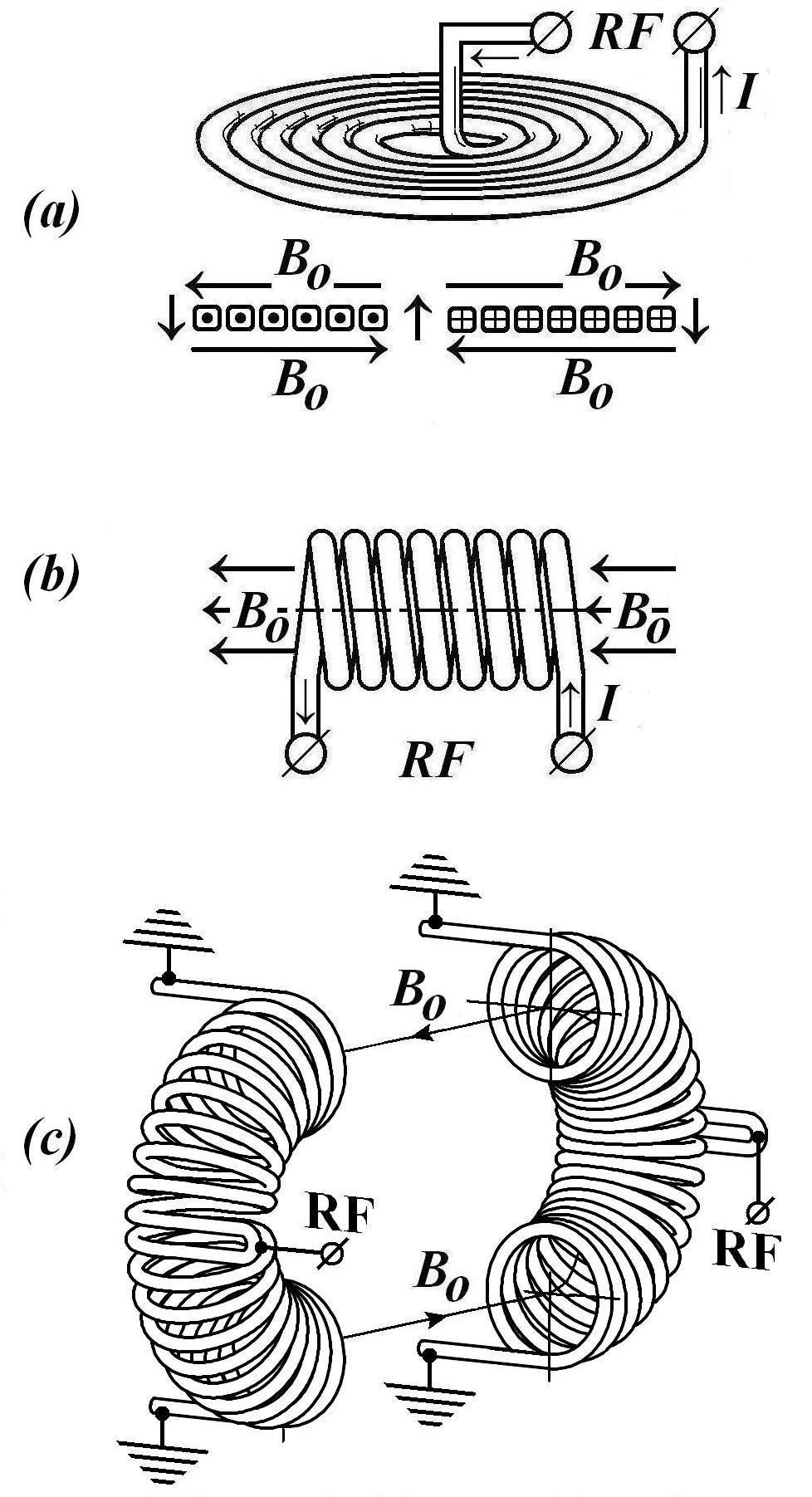
Fig. 3. Conventional Plasma Inductors

In planar geometry, the electrode is a length of flat metal wound like a spiral (or coil). In cylindrical geometry, it is like a helical spring. In half-toroidal geometry, it is a toroidal solenoid cut along its main diameter to two equal halves.

When a time-varying electric current is passed through the coil, it creates a time-varying magnetic field around it, with flux

$\Phi=\pi r^2 H=\pi r^2 H_0 \cos \omega t$,

where r is the distance to the center of coil (and of the quartz tube).

According to the Faraday–Lenz's law of induction, this creates azimuthal electromotive force in the rarefied gas:

$U=-\frac{d \Phi}{dt}$,

which corresponds to electric field strengths of

$E=\frac{U}{2 \pi r}=\frac{\omega r H_0}{2} \sin \omega t$,

leading to the formation of the electron trajectories providing a plasma generation. The dependence on r suggests that the gas ion motion is most intense in the outer region of the flame, where the temperature is the greatest. In the real torch, the flame is cooled by the cooling gas from the outside, so the hottest outer part is at thermal equilibrium. Temperature there reaches 5 000 – 6 000 K. For more rigorous description, see Hamilton–Jacobi equation in electromagnetic fields.

The frequency of alternating current used in the RLC circuit which contains the coil is usually 27–41 MHz. To induce plasma, a spark is produced at the electrodes at the gas outlet. Argon is one example of a commonly used rarefied gas. The high temperature of the plasma allows the atomization of molecules and thus determination of many elements, and in addition, for about 60 elements the degree of ionization in the torch exceeds 90%. The ICP torch consumes c. 1250–1550 W of power, and this depends on the element composition of the sample (due to different ionization energies).

The ICPs have two operation modes, called capacitive (E) mode with low plasma density and inductive (H) mode with high plasma density. Transition from E to H heating mode occurs with external inputs.

== Applications ==
Plasma electron temperatures can range between ~6,000 K and ~10,000 K and are usually several orders of magnitude greater than the temperature of the neutral species. Temperatures of argon ICP plasma discharge are typically ~5,500 to 6,500 K and are therefore comparable to those reached at the surface (photosphere) of the sun (~4,500 K to ~6,000 K). ICP discharges are of relatively high electron density, on the order of 10^{15} cm^{−3}. As a result, ICP discharges have wide applications wherever a high-density plasma (HDP) is needed.

- ICP-AES/ICP-OES, a type of atomic emission spectroscopy.
- ICP-MS, a type of mass spectrometry.
- ICP-RIE, a type of reactive-ion etching.

Another benefit of ICP discharges is that they are relatively free of contamination, because the electrodes are completely outside the reaction chamber. By contrast, in a capacitively coupled plasma (CCP), the electrodes are often placed inside the reactor chamber and are thus exposed to the plasma and to subsequent reactive chemical species.

== See also ==
- Capacitively coupled plasma
- Induction plasma technology
- Pulsed inductive thruster
