= Townsend (unit) =

The townsend (symbol Td) is a physical unit of the reduced electric field (ratio E/N), where $E$ is electric field and $N$ is concentration of neutral particles.

It is named after John Sealy Townsend, who conducted early research into gas ionisation.

== Definition ==
It is defined by the relation
$$1\ \text{Td} = 10^{-21}\ \text{V} \cdot \text{m}^2 = 10^{-17}\ \text{V} \cdot \text{cm}^2.$$

For example, an electric field of
$$E = 2.5 \cdot 10^4\ \text{V}/\text{m}$$
in a medium with the density of an ideal gas at 1 atm and 0 °C, the Loschmidt constant
$$n_0 = 2.6867811 \cdot 10^{25}\ \text{m}^{-3}$$
gives
$$E/n_0 \approx 10^{-21}\ \text{V} \cdot \text{m}^2,$$
which corresponds to 1 Td.

== Uses ==
This unit is important in gas-discharge physics, where it serves as scaling parameter because the mean energy of electrons (and therefore many other properties of discharge) is typically a function of $E/N$ over broad range of $E$ and $N$.

The concentration $N$, which is in ideal gas simply related to pressure and temperature, controls the mean free path and collision frequency. The electric field $E$ governs the energy gained between two successive collisions.

Reduced electric field being a scaling factor effectively means that increasing the electric field intensity E by some factor q has the same consequences as lowering gas density N by factor q.

== See also ==
- Electric glow discharge
- Vacuum arc
