= Terrestrial gamma-ray flash =

Burst of gamma rays produced in the Earth's atmosphere

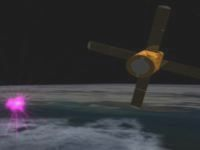
Artist's conception of gamma-ray flash and related phenomena.

The red dots show some of the ~500 terrestrial gamma-ray flashes daily detected by the Fermi Gamma-ray Space Telescope through 2010.

A terrestrial gamma-ray flash (TGF), also known as dark lightning, is a burst of gamma rays produced in Earth's atmosphere. TGFs have been recorded to last 0.2 to 3.5 milliseconds, and have energies of up to 20 million electronvolts. It is speculated that TGFs are caused by intense electric fields produced above or inside thunderstorms. Scientists have also detected energetic positrons and electrons produced by terrestrial gamma-ray flashes.

== Discovery ==
Energy plot of a typical TGF event, with artist's conception of a gamma-ray flash superimposed.

Terrestrial gamma-ray flashes were first discovered in 1994 by BATSE, or Burst and Transient Source Experiment, on the Compton Gamma Ray Observatory, a NASA spacecraft. A subsequent study from Stanford University in 1996 linked a TGF to an individual lightning strike occurring within a few milliseconds of the TGF. BATSE detected only a small number of TGF events in nine years (76), due to it having been constructed to study gamma ray bursts from outer space, which last much longer.

In the early 2000s, the Ramaty High Energy Solar Spectroscopic Imager (RHESSI) satellite observed TGFs with much higher energies than those recorded by BATSE. The RHESSI data led scientists to estimate that approximately 50 TGFs occur each day, more than previously thought but still only representing a very small fraction of the total lightning on Earth (3–4 million lightning events per day on average). A few years later, scientists using NASA's Fermi Gamma-ray Space Telescope, which was designed to monitor gamma rays, estimated that about 500 TGFs occur daily worldwide, but most go undetected.

== Mechanism ==
Hypothetical TGF production above a thundercloud driven by decaying fields after a large lightning discharge.

Though the details of the mechanism are uncertain, there is a consensus forming about the physical requirements. It is presumed that TGF photons are emitted by electrons traveling at speeds very close to the speed of light that collide with the nuclei of atoms in the air and release their energy in the form of gamma rays (bremsstrahlung). Large populations of energetic electrons can form by avalanche growth driven by electric fields, a phenomenon called relativistic runaway electron avalanche (RREA). The electric field is likely provided by lightning, as most TGFs have been shown to occur within a few milliseconds of a lightning event. Beyond this basic picture the details are uncertain. Recent research has shown that electron–electron bremsstrahlung leads first to an enrichment of high-energy electrons and subsequently enlarges the number of high-energy photons.

Some of standard theoretical frameworks have been borrowed from other lightning-associated discharges like sprites, blue jets, and elves, which were discovered in the years immediately preceding the first TGF observations. For instance, that field may be due to the separation of charges in a thundercloud ("DC" field) often associated with sprites, or due to the electromagnetic pulse (EMP) produced by a lightning discharge, often associated with elves. There is also some evidence that certain TGFs occur in the absence of lightning strikes, though in the vicinity of general lightning activity, which has evoked comparisons to blue jets.

Hypothetical TGF production near a thundercloud driven by electromagnetic waves radiated by a large lightning current pulse.

The DC field model requires a very large thundercloud charge to create sufficient fields at high altitudes (e.g. 50–90 km (31–56 mi), where sprites form). Unlike the case of sprites, these large charges do not seem to be associated with TGF-generating lightning. Thus the DC field model requires the TGF to occur lower down, at the top of the thundercloud (10–20 km (6.2–12.4 mi)) where a local field can be stronger. This hypothesis is supported by two independent observations. First, the spectrum of the gamma-rays seen by RHESSI matches very well to the prediction of relativistic runaway at 15–20 km (9.3–12.4 mi). Second, TGFs are strongly concentrated around Earth's equator when compared to lightning. (They may also be concentrated over water compared to lightning in general.) Thundercloud tops are higher near the equator, and thus the gamma-rays from TGFs produced there have a better chance of escaping the atmosphere. The implication would then be that there are many lower-altitude TGFs not seen from space, particularly at higher latitudes.

Hypothetical TGF production within a thundercloud.

An alternative hypothesis, the EMP model, relaxes the requirement on thundercloud charge but instead requires a large current pulse moving at very high speed. The required current pulse speed is very restrictive, and there is not yet any direct observational support for this model.

Another hypothetical mechanism is that TGFs are produced within the thundercloud itself, either in the strong electric fields near the lightning channel or in the static fields that exist over large volumes of the cloud. These mechanisms rely on extreme activity of the lightning channel to start the process (Carlson et al. 2010) or on strong feedback to allow even small-scale random events to trigger production. The Atmosphere-Space Interactions Monitor (ASIM), dedicated to measuring simultaneously optical signals of lightning and signals of terrestrial gamma-ray flashes, revealed that TGFs are usually associated with optical flashes, strongly suggesting that relativistic electrons as precursors of TGFs are produced in the strong electric fields in the proximity of lightning channels.

TGFs may be generated in the huge columns of a volcanic eruption, such as the 2022 Hunga Tonga–Hunga Ha'apai eruption.

== Conjugate events ==
A terrestrial gamma-ray flash event (magenta) with associated electron/positron beams (yellow/green) moving along a magnetic field line which can eventually bounce back on the magnetic mirror point.

It has been suggested that TGFs must also launch beams of highly relativistic electrons and positrons which escape the atmosphere, propagate along Earth's magnetic field and precipitate on the opposite hemisphere. A few cases of TGFs on RHESSI, BATSE, and Fermi-GBM have shown unusual patterns that can be explained by such electron/positron beams, but such events are very unusual.

Calculations have shown that TGFs can liberate not only positrons, but also neutrons and protons. Neutrons have already been measured in electric discharges, whereas there is no experimental confirmation of discharge related protons as of 2016. Recent research has shown that the fluence of these neutrons lies between 10^{−9} and 10^{−13} per ms and per m^{2} depending on the detection altitude. The energy of most of these neutrons, even with initial energies of 20 MeV, decreases down to the keV range within 1 ms.

== Other research ==
Terrestrial gamma-ray flashes pose a challenge to current theories of lightning, especially with the discovery of the clear signatures of antimatter produced in lightning.

It has been discovered in the past 15 years that among the processes of lightning is some mechanism capable of generating gamma rays, which escape the atmosphere and are observed by orbiting spacecraft. These terrestrial gamma-ray flashes (TGFs) were observed by accident, while he was documenting instances of extraterrestrial gamma ray bursts observed by the Compton Gamma Ray Observatory (CGRO). TGFs are much shorter in duration, however, lasting only about 1 ms.

In 1996, a study of very low frequency (VLF) / extremely low frequency (ELF) radio data from Palmer Station in Antarctica linked a TGF to an individual lightning stroke occurring within 1.5 ms of the TGF event, proving for the first time that the TGF was of atmospheric origin and associated with lightning strikes.

CGRO recorded only about 77 events in 10 years; however, more recently the Reuven Ramaty High Energy Solar Spectroscopic Imager (RHESSI) spacecraft has been observing TGFs at a much higher rate, indicating that these occur about 50 times per day globally (still a very small fraction of the total lightning on the planet). The energy levels recorded exceed 20 MeV.

Scientists from Duke University have also been studying the link between certain lightning events and the mysterious gamma ray emissions that emanate from the Earth's own atmosphere, in light of newer observations of TGFs made by RHESSI. Their study suggests that this gamma radiation fountains upward from starting points at low altitudes in thunderclouds.

Steven Cummer, from Duke University's Pratt School of Engineering, said, "These are higher energy gamma rays than those coming from the Sun. And yet here they are coming from the kind of terrestrial thunderstorm that we see here all the time."

Early hypotheses of this pointed to lightning generating high electric fields and driving a relativistic runaway electron avalanche at altitudes well above the cloud cover where the thin atmosphere allows gamma rays to easily escape into space, similar to the way upper-atmospheric lightning is generated. Subsequent evidence however, has suggested instead that TGFs may be produced by driving relativistic electron avalanches within or just above high thunderclouds. Though hindered by atmospheric absorption of the escaping gamma rays, these theories do not require the exceptionally intense lightning that high altitude theories of TGF generation rely on.

The role of TGFs and their relationship to lightning remains a subject of ongoing scientific study.

In 2009, the Fermi Gamma-ray Space Telescope in Earth orbit observed intense burst of gamma rays corresponding to positron annihilations coming out of a storm formation. Scientists would not have been surprised to see a few positrons accompanying any intense gamma ray burst, but the lightning flash detected by Fermi appeared to have produced about 100 trillion positrons. This was reported by news media in January 2011, and had never been previously observed.

The Atmosphere-Space Interactions Monitor (ASIM), an experiment dedicated to study TGFs, was launched to the International Space Station on 2 April 2018 and was mounted on the Columbus External Payload Facility on 13 April 2018.

== See also ==
- Gamma-ray bursts
- Red sprite
- Blue jet
- Lightning
