= Electric discharge in gases =

Current flowing through an ionized gas

Electric discharge in gases occurs when electric current flows through a gaseous medium due to ionization of the gas. Depending on several factors, the discharge may radiate visible light. The properties of electric discharges in gases are studied in connection with design of lighting sources and in the design of high voltage electrical equipment.

== Discharge types ==
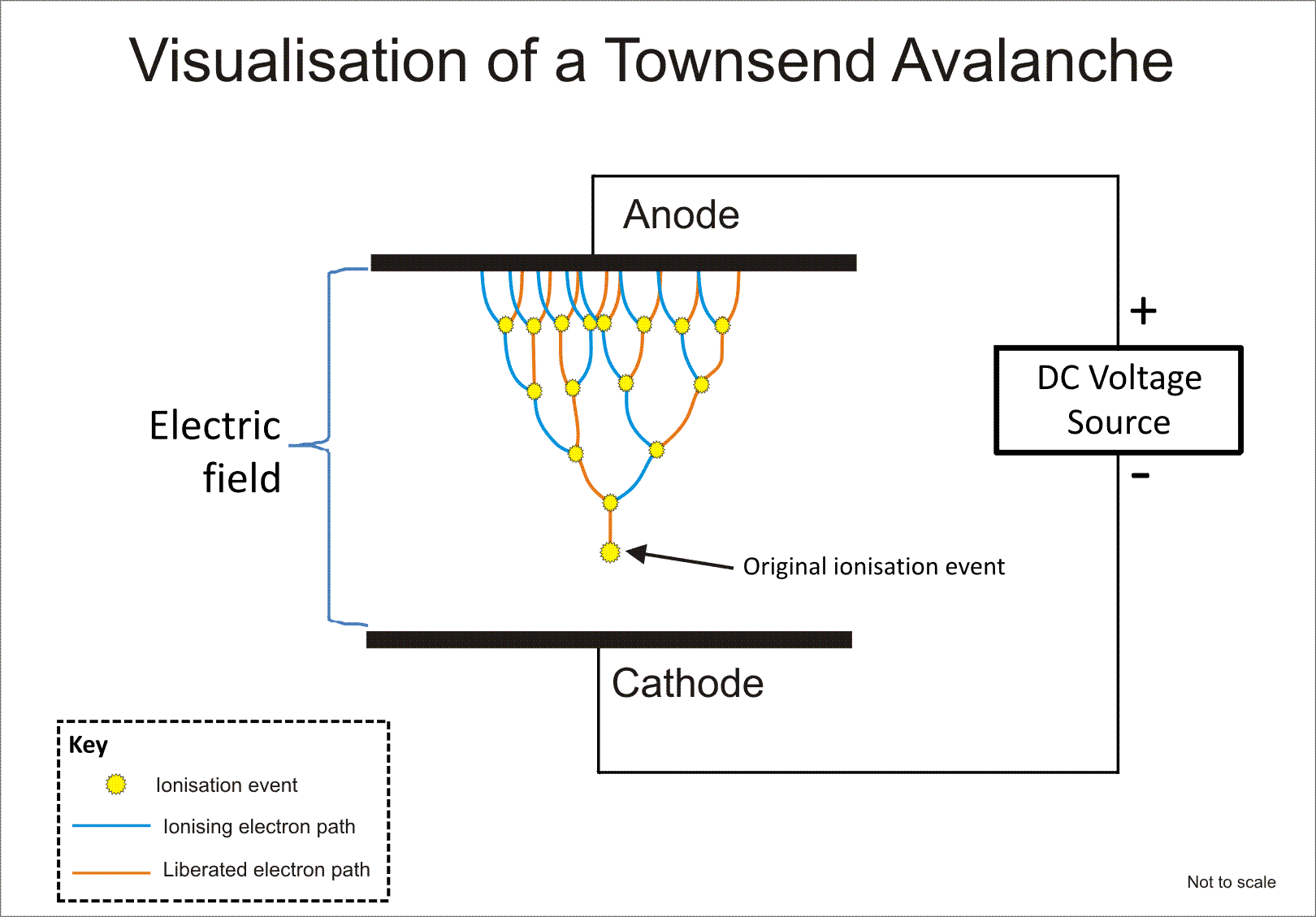
Avalanche effect between two electrodes. The original ionisation event liberates one electron, and each subsequent collision liberates a further electron, so two electrons emerge from each collision: the ionising electron and the liberated electron.

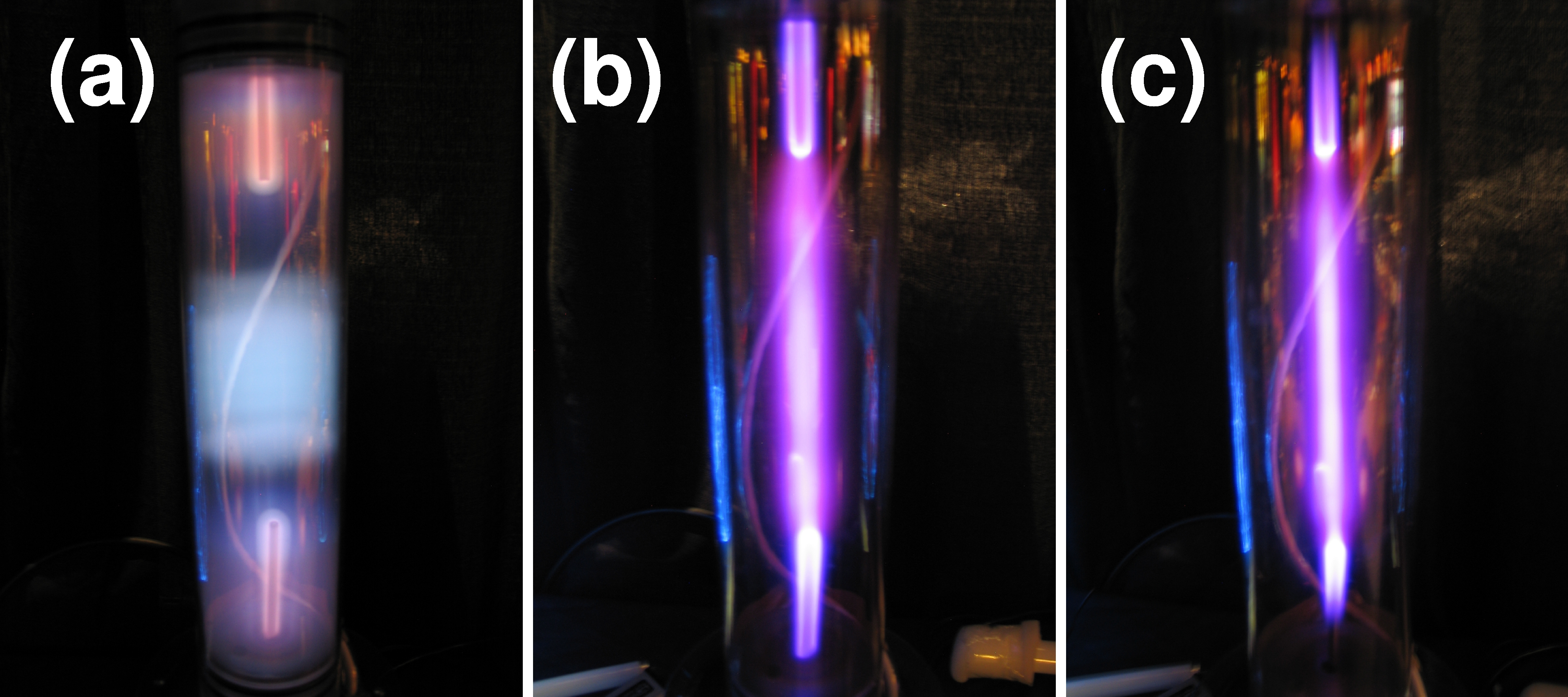
Transition from glow to arc discharge in argon, by increasing the gas pressure.

Voltage-current characteristics of electrical discharge in neon at 1 torr, with two planar electrodes separated by 50 cm. A: random pulses by cosmic radiation B: saturation current C: avalanche Townsend discharge D: self-sustained Townsend discharge E: unstable region: corona discharge F: sub-normal glow discharge G: normal glow discharge H: abnormal glow discharge I: unstable region: glow-arc transition J: electric arc K: electric arc The A-D region is called a dark discharge; there is some ionization, but the current is below 10 microamperes and there is no significant amount of radiation produced. The F-H region is a region of glow discharge; the plasma emits a faint glow that occupies almost all the volume of the tube; most of the light is emitted by excited neutral atoms. The I-K region is a region of arc discharge; the plasma is concentrated in a narrow channel along the center of the tube; a great amount of radiation is produced.

In cold cathode tubes, the electric discharge in gas has three regions, with distinct current–voltage characteristics:

- I: Townsend discharge, below the breakdown voltage. At low voltages, the only current is that due to the generation of charge carriers in the gas by cosmic rays or other sources of ionizing radiation. As the applied voltage is increased, the free electrons carrying the current gain enough energy to cause further ionization, causing an electron avalanche. In this regime, the current increases from femtoamperes to microamperes, i.e. by nine orders of magnitude, for very little further increase in voltage. The voltage-current characteristics begins tapering off near the breakdown voltage and the glow becomes visible.
- II: glow discharge, which occurs once the breakdown voltage is reached. The voltage across the electrodes suddenly drops and the current increases to milliampere range. At lower currents, the voltage across the tube is almost current-independent; this is used in glow discharge voltage-regulator tubes. At lower currents, the area of the electrodes covered by the glow discharge is proportional to the current. At higher currents the normal glow turns into abnormal glow, the voltage across the tube gradually increases, and the glow discharge covers more and more of the surface of the electrodes. Low-power switching (glow-discharge thyratrons), voltage stabilization, and lighting applications (e.g. Nixie tubes, decatrons, neon lamps) operate in this region.
- III: arc discharge, which occurs in the ampere range of the current; the voltage across the tube drops with increasing current. High-current switching tubes, e.g. triggered spark gap, ignitron, thyratron and krytron (and its vacuum tube derivate, sprytron, using vacuum arc), high-power mercury-arc valves and high-power light sources, e.g. mercury-vapor lamps and metal halide lamps, operate in this range.

Glow discharge is facilitated by electrons striking the gas atoms and ionizing them. For formation of glow discharge, the mean free path of the electrons has to be reasonably long but shorter than the distance between the electrodes; glow discharges therefore do not readily occur at both too low and too high gas pressures.

The breakdown voltage for the glow discharge depends nonlinearly on the product of gas pressure and electrode distance according to Paschen's law. For a certain pressure × distance value, there is a lowest breakdown voltage. The increase of strike voltage for shorter electrode distances is related to too long mean free path of the electrons in comparison with the electrode distance.

A small amount of a radioactive element may be added into the tube, either as a separate piece of material (e.g. nickel-63 in krytrons) or as addition to the alloy of the electrodes (e.g. thorium), to preionize the gas and increase the reliability of electrical breakdown and glow or arc discharge ignition. A gaseous radioactive isotope, e.g. krypton-85, can also be used. Ignition electrodes and keepalive discharge electrodes can also be employed.

The E/N ratio between the electric field E and the concentration of neutral particles N is often used, because the mean energy of electrons (and therefore many other properties of discharge) is a function of E/N. Increasing the electric intensity E by some factor q has the same consequences as lowering gas density N by factor q.

Its SI unit is V·cm^{2}, but the Townsend unit (Td) is frequently used.

== Application in analog computation ==
The use of a glow discharge for solution of certain mapping problems was described in 2002. According to a Nature news article describing the work, researchers at Imperial College London demonstrated how they built a mini-map that gives tourists luminous route indicators. To make the one-inch London chip, the team etched a plan of the city centre on a glass slide. Fitting a flat lid over the top turned the streets into hollow, connected tubes. They filled these with helium gas, and inserted electrodes at key tourist hubs. When a voltage is applied between two points, electricity naturally runs through the streets along the shortest route from A to B – and the gas glows like a tiny glowing strip light. The approach itself provides a novel visible analog computing approach for solving a wide class of maze searching problems based on the properties of lighting up of a glow discharge in a microfluidic chip.
