= Space charge =

Electric charge treated as continuously distributed in space

Space charge is an interpretation of a collection of electric charges in which excess electric charge is treated as a continuum of charge distributed over a region of space (either a volume or an area) rather than distinct point-like charges. This model typically applies when charge carriers have been emitted from some region of a solid—the cloud of emitted carriers can form a space charge region if they are sufficiently spread out, or the charged atoms or molecules left behind in the solid can form a space charge region.

Space charge effects are most pronounced in dielectric media (including vacuum); in highly conductive media, the charge tends to be rapidly neutralized or screened. The sign of the space charge can be either negative or positive. This situation is perhaps most familiar in the area near a metal object when it is heated to incandescence in a vacuum. This effect was first observed by Thomas Edison in light bulb filaments, where it is sometimes called the Edison effect. Space charge is a significant phenomenon in many vacuum and solid-state electronic devices.

== Cause ==
=== Physical explanation ===
When a metal object is placed in a vacuum and is heated to incandescence, the energy is sufficient to cause electrons to "boil" away from the surface atoms and surround the metal object in a cloud of free electrons. This is called thermionic emission. The resulting cloud is negatively charged, and can be attracted to any nearby positively charged object, thus producing an electric current which passes through the vacuum.

Space charge can result from a range of phenomena, but the most important are:

1. Combination of the current density and spatially inhomogeneous resistance
2. Ionization of species within the dielectric to form heterocharge
3. Charge injection from electrodes and from a stress enhancement
4. Polarization in structures such as water trees. "Water tree" is a name given to a tree-like figure appearing in a water-impregnated polymer insulating cable.

It has been suggested that in alternating current (AC) most carriers injected at electrodes during a half cycle are ejected during the next half cycle, so the net balance of charge on a cycle is practically zero. However, a small fraction of the carriers can be trapped at levels deep enough to retain them when the field is inverted. The amount of charge in AC should increase slower than in direct current (DC) and become observable after longer periods of time.

==== Hetero and homo charge ====
Hetero charge means that the polarity of the space charge is opposite to that of neighboring electrode, and homo charge is the reverse situation. Under high voltage application, a hetero charge near the electrode is expected to reduce the breakdown voltage, whereas a homo charge will increase it. After polarity reversal under ac conditions, the homo charge is converted to hetero space charge.

=== Mathematical explanation ===
If the near "vacuum" has a pressure of 10^{−6} mmHg or less, the main vehicle of conduction is electrons. The emission current density, $J$, from the cathode, as a function of its thermodynamic temperature, $T$, in the absence of space-charge, is given by Richardson's law:
$$J = (1-\tilde{r}) A_0 T^2 e^\left(\frac{-\phi}{kT}\right)$$
where

- $A_0 = \frac{4\pi e m_\mathrm{e} k^2}{h^3} \approx 1.2 \cdot 10^6 \mathrm{A{\cdot}m^{-2}{\cdot}K^{-2}} =$ a chemical constant of the electron gas,
- $e = 1.6 \cdot 10^{-19} \text{ C} =$ elementary positive charge (i.e., magnitude of electron charge),
- $m_e = 9.11 \cdot 10^{-31} \text{ kg} =$ electron mass,
- $k = 1.38 \cdot 10^{-23} \text{ J}\cdot\text{K}^{-1} =$ Boltzmann constant,
- $h = 6.62 \cdot 10^{-34} \text{ J}\cdot\text{s} =$ Planck constant,
- $\phi =$ work function of the cathode,
- $\tilde{r} =$ mean electron reflection coefficient.

The reflection coefficient can be as low as 0.105 but is usually near 0.5. For tungsten, for example, $(1-\tilde{r}) A_0 = (0.6\text{ to }1.0)\cdot 10^6 \mathrm{ A{\cdot}m^{-2}{\cdot}K^{-2}}$, and $\phi = 4.52 { eV}$. At 2500 °C, the emission is $28207 \text{ A}\cdot{m}^{-2}$.

The emission current as given above is many times greater than that normally collected by the electrodes, except in some pulsed valves such as the cavity magnetron. Most of the electrons emitted by the cathode are driven back to it by the repulsion of the cloud of electrons in its neighborhood. This is called the space charge effect. In the limit of large current densities, $J$ is given by the Child–Langmuir equation below, rather than by the thermionic emission equation above.

== Occurrence ==
Space charge is an inherent property of all vacuum tubes. This has at times made life harder or easier for electrical engineers who used tubes in their designs. For example, space charge significantly limited the practical application of triode amplifiers which led to further innovations such as the vacuum tube tetrode.

On the other hand, space charge was useful in some tube applications because it generates a negative EMF within the tube's envelope, which could be used to create a negative bias on the tube's grid. Grid bias could also be achieved by using an applied grid voltage in addition to the control voltage. This could improve the engineer's control and fidelity of amplification. It allowed the construction of space charge tubes for car radios that required only 6 or 12 volts anode voltage (typical examples were the 6DR8/EBF83, 6GM8/ECC86, 6DS8/ECH83, 6ES6/EF97 and 6ET6/EF98).

Space charges can also occur within dielectrics. For example, when gas near a high voltage electrode begins to undergo dielectric breakdown, electrical charges are injected into the region near the electrode, forming space charge regions in the surrounding gas. Space charges can also occur within solid or liquid dielectrics that are stressed by high electric fields. Trapped space charges within solid dielectrics are often a contributing factor leading to dielectric failure within high voltage power cables and capacitors.

In semiconductor physics, space charge layers that are depleted of charge carriers are used as a model to explain the rectifying behaviour of p–n junctions and the buildup of a voltage in photovoltaic cells.

== Space-charge-limited current ==
=== In vacuum (Child's law) ===
Graph showing Child–Langmuir law. S and d are constant and equal to 1.

First proposed by Clement D. Child in 1911, Child's law states that the space-charge-limited current (SCLC) in a plane-parallel vacuum diode varies directly as the three-halves power of the anode voltage $V$ and inversely as the square of the distance $d$ separating the cathode and the anode.

For electrons, the current density $J$ (amperes per meter squared) is written:
$$J = \frac{ I }{ S } =\frac{4 \varepsilon_0}{9}\sqrt{\frac{2e}{m_\mathrm{e}}} \frac{V^{3/2}}{d^2}.$$
where $I$ is the anode current and $S$ the surface area of the anode receiving the current; $e$ is the magnitude of the charge of the electron and $m_\mathrm{e}$ is its mass. The equation is also known as the "three-halves-power law" or the Child–Langmuir law. Child originally derived this equation for the case of atomic ions, which have much smaller ratios of their charge to their mass. Irving Langmuir published the application to electron currents in 1913, and extended it to the case of cylindrical cathodes and anodes.

The equation's validity is subject to the following assumptions:

1. Electrons travel ballistically between electrodes (i.e., no scattering).
2. In the interelectrode region, the space charge of any ions is negligible.
3. The electrons have zero velocity at the cathode surface.

The assumption of no scattering (ballistic transport) is what makes the predictions of Child–Langmuir law different from those of Mott–Gurney law. The latter assumes steady-state drift transport and therefore strong scattering.

Child's law was further generalized by Buford R. Conley in 1995 for the case of non-zero velocity at the cathode surface with the following equation:

$${I} = \frac{2 \varepsilon _0 m}{9 q d^2} \left(\nu _{\text{initial}}^{3/2}-\left(\nu _{\text{initial}}^2 + \frac{2 q V}{m}\right)^{3/4} \right)^2$$

where $\nu _{\text{initial}}$ is the initial velocity of the particle. This equation reduces to Child's Law for the special case of $\nu _{\text{initial}}$ equal to zero.

In recent years, various models of SCLC current have been revised as reported in two review papers.

=== In semiconductors ===
In semiconductors and insulating materials, an electric field causes charged particles, electrons, to reach a specific drift velocity that is parallel to the direction of the field. This is different from the behavior of the free charged particles in a vacuum, in which a field accelerates the particle. The proportionality factor between the magnitudes of the drift velocity, $v$, and the electric field, $\mathcal E$, is called the mobility, $\mu$:
$$v = \mu \mathcal{E}$$

==== Drift regime (Mott–Gurney law) ====
The Child's law behavior of a space-charge-limited current that applies in a vacuum diode doesn't generally apply to a semiconductor/insulator in a single-carrier device, and is replaced by the Mott–Gurney law. For a thin slab of material of thickness $L$, sandwiched between two selective Ohmic contacts, the electric current density, $J$, flowing through the slab is given by:
$$J=\frac{9}{8} \varepsilon \mu \frac{V^2}{L^3},$$
where $V$ is the voltage that has been applied across the slab and $\varepsilon$ is the permittivity of the solid. The Mott–Gurney law offers some crucial insight into charge-transport across an intrinsic semiconductor, namely that one should not expect the drift current to increase linearly with the applied voltage, i.e., from Ohm's law, as one would expect from charge-transport across a metal or highly doped semiconductor. Since the only unknown quantity in the Mott–Gurney law is the charge-carrier mobility, $\mu$, the equation is commonly used to characterize charge transport in intrinsic semiconductors. Using the Mott–Gurney law for characterizing amorphous semiconductors, along with semiconductors containing defects and/or non-Ohmic contacts, should however be approached with caution as significant deviations both in the magnitude of the current and the power law dependence with respect to the voltage will be observed. In those cases the Mott–Gurney law can not be readily used for characterization, and other equations which can account for defects and/or non-ideal injection should be used instead.

During the derivation of the Mott–Gurney law, one has to make the following assumptions:

1. There is only one type of charge carrier present, i.e., only electrons or holes.
2. The material has no intrinsic conductivity, but charges are injected into it from one electrode and captured by the other.
3. The carrier mobility, $\mu$, and the permittivity, $\varepsilon$, are constant throughout the sample.
4. The current flow is not limited by traps or energetic disorder.
5. The current is not predominantly due to doping.
6. The electric field at the charge-injecting electrode is zero, meaning that the current is governed by drift only.

Derivation

Consider a crystal of thickness $L$ carrying a current $J$. Let $E(x)$ be the electric field at a distance $x$ from the surface, and $n(x)$ the number of electrons per unit volume. Then the current is given has two contributions, one due to drift and the other due to diffusion:
$$J = en{\mu}E - De\frac{dn}{dx},$$

When ${\mu}$ is the electrons mobility and $D$ the diffusion coefficient. Laplace's equation gives for the field:
$$\frac{dE}{dx} = e\frac{n}{\varepsilon} .$$

Hence, eliminating $n$, we have:
$$J = {\varepsilon}{\mu}E\frac{dE}{dx} - \varepsilon D\frac{d^2 E}{dx^2} .$$

After integrating, making use of the Einstein relation and neglecting the $\frac{dE}{dx}$ term we obtain for the electric field:
$$E = \sqrt{ \frac{2J}{\varepsilon\mu} (x + x_0)} ,$$
where $x_0$ is a constant. We may neglect the $\frac{dE}{dx}$ term because we are supposing that $\frac{dE}{dx} \sim \frac{E}{L}$ and $KT\frac{dE}{dx} \ll e E^2$.

Since, at $x = 0$, $n = n_0$, we have:

$$x_0 = \frac{J\varepsilon}{2\mu n_0^2 e^2} .$$	⁎

It follows that the potential drop across the crystal is:

$$V = \frac{2}{3}\sqrt{ \frac{2J}{\varepsilon \mu}} \left[ \left( L+x_0 \right)^{\frac{3}{2} } - x_0^{\frac{3}{2}}\right].$$	⁎⁎

Making use of (⁎) and (⁎⁎) we can write $J$ in terms of $V$. For small $V$, $J$ is small and $x_0 \ll L$, so that:

$$J = \frac{9}{8} \varepsilon \mu \frac{V^2}{L^3}.$$	∎

Thus the current increases as the square of $V$. For large $V$, $x_0 \gg L$ and we obtain:
$$J = \frac{1}{2} \frac{e \mu n_0 V}{L}.$$

As an application example, the steady-state space-charge-limited current across a piece of intrinsic silicon with a charge-carrier mobility of 1500 cm^{2}/Vs, a relative dielectric constant of 11.9, an area of 10^{−8} cm^{2} and a thickness of 10^{−4} cm can be calculated by an online calculator to be 126.4 μA at 3 V. Note that in order for this calculation to be accurate, one must assume all the points listed above.

In the case where the electron/hole transport is limited by trap states in the form of exponential tails extending from the conduction/valence band edges,
$$n_\mathrm{t}=\frac{N_\mathrm{t}}{k_\mathrm{B}T_\mathrm{c}}\exp \left( - \frac{E}{k_\mathrm{B}T_\mathrm{c}} \right) ,$$
the drift current density is given by the Mark-Helfrich equation,
$$J= q^{1-\ell}{\mu}{N_\mathrm{eff}} \left(\frac{\varepsilon_\mathrm{r} \varepsilon_0 \ell}{N_\mathrm{t}(\ell+1)}\right)^\ell \left( \frac{2\ell+1}{\ell+1} \right)^{\ell+1} \frac{{V}^{\ell+1}}{{L}^{2\ell+1}}$$
where $q$ is the elementary charge, $\ell=k_\mathrm{B}T_\mathrm{c}/k_\mathrm{B}T$ with $k_\mathrm{B}T$ being the thermal energy, $N_\mathrm{eff}$ is the effective density of states of the charge carrier type in the semiconductor, i.e., either $E_\mathrm{C}$ or $E_\mathrm{V}$, and $N_\mathrm{t}$ is the trap density.

==== Low voltage regime ====
In the case where a very small applied bias is applied across the single-carrier device, the current is given by:
$$J = 4{\pi}^2 \frac{k_\mathrm{B}T}{q} \mu \varepsilon \frac{V}{L^3} .$$

Note that the equation describing the current in the low voltage regime follows the same thickness scaling as the Mott–Gurney law, $L^{-3}$, but increases linearly with the applied voltage.

==== Saturation regimes ====
When a very large voltage is applied across the semiconductor, the current can transition into a saturation regime.

In the velocity-saturation regime, this equation takes the following form
$$J=2\varepsilon v\frac{V}{L^2}$$

Note the different dependence of $J$ on $V$ between the Mott–Gurney law and the equation describing the current in the velocity-saturation regime. In the ballistic case (assuming no collisions), the Mott–Gurney equation takes the form of the more familiar Child–Langmuir law.

In the charge-carrier saturation regime, the current through the sample is given by,
$$J = q \mu N_\mathrm{eff} \frac{V}{L}$$
where $N_\mathrm{eff}$ is the effective density of states of the charge carrier type in the semiconductor.

== Shot noise ==
Space charge tends to reduce shot noise. Shot noise results from the random arrivals of discrete charge; the statistical variation in the arrivals produces shot noise. A space charge develops a potential that slows the carriers down. For example, an electron approaching a cloud of other electrons will slow down due to the repulsive force. The slowing carriers also increases the space charge density and resulting potential. In addition, the potential developed by the space charge can reduce the number of carriers emitted. When the space charge limits the current, the random arrivals of the carriers are smoothed out; the reduced variation results in less shot noise.

== See also ==
- Thermionic emission
- Vacuum tube
- Grid leak
- Low energy beam transport in linac and storage rings.
