= Overvoltage =

When voltage across/within a circuit is raised beyond the design limit

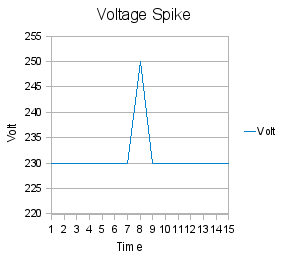
Voltage spike.

In electrical engineering, overvoltage is the raising of voltage beyond the design limit of a circuit or circuit element. The conditions may be hazardous. Depending on its duration, the overvoltage event can be transient—a short (milliseconds) voltage spike—or sustained (also known as power frequency overvoltage) with a stable value on multiple terminals. In an electrical grid, voltage control and reactive power management are inseparable facets of a single activity.

== Explanation ==
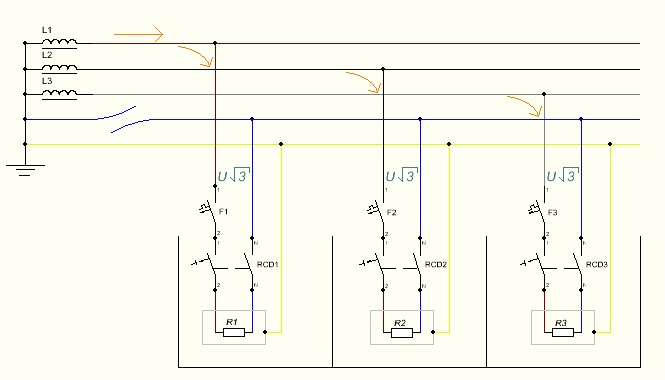
A 3-phase, star-connected electric system with a broken neutral wire. A fault caused the neutral voltage to be no longer clamped to ground and the wire can float as high as the line voltage. This can create overvoltage conditions for small appliances connected to a single phase (as the line voltage is much higher than the phase voltage)

Electronic and electrical devices are designed to operate at a certain maximum supply voltage, and considerable damage can be caused by voltage that is higher than that for which the devices are rated.

For example, an electric light bulb has a wire in it that at the given rated voltage will carry a current just large enough for the wire to get very hot (giving off light and heat), but not hot enough for it to melt. The amount of current in a circuit depends on the voltage supplied: if the voltage is too high, then the wire may melt and the light bulb burn out. Similarly other electrical devices may stop working, or may even burst into flames if an overvoltage is delivered to the circuit.

== Sources ==
=== Natural ===
A typical natural source of transient overvoltage events is lightning. Bursts of solar wind following solar flares are also known to cause overvoltage in electrical circuits, especially onboard space satellites.

=== Man-made ===
Man-made sources of spikes are usually caused by electromagnetic induction when switching on or off inductive loads (such as electric motors or electromagnets), or by switching heavy resistive AC loads when zero-crossing circuitry is not used - anywhere a large change of current takes place. One of the purposes of electromagnetic compatibility compliance is to eliminate such sources.

An important potential source of dangerous overvoltage is electronic warfare. There is intensive military research in this field, whose goal is to produce various transient electromagnetic devices designed to generate electromagnetic pulses that will disable an enemy's electronic equipment. A recent military development is that of the exploding capacitor designed to radiate a high voltage electromagnetic pulse. Another intense source of an electromagnetic pulse is a nuclear explosion.

Diesel or petrol powered generators can also be a source of overvoltage. If the generator speed increases suddenly, such as due to inadvertent throttle movement or unstable operation of the prime mover, this can cause brief but damaging overvoltage to any connected equipment. A faulty voltage regulator can also cause overvoltage.

An example of an overvoltage event occurred on August 25, 2011, in East Palo Alto, California. The line voltage supplied to 232 customers increased from 110 volts to around 400 volts for 80 minutes. The event damaged electronic equipment, light bulbs, and other electrical equipment including smart meters. The opposite of such an event is a brownout.

== Conduction path ==
The transient pulses can get into the equipment either by power or data lines, or directly through space from a strong electromagnetic field change - an electromagnetic pulse (EMP). Filters are used to prevent spikes entering or leaving the equipment through wires, and the devices coupled electromagnetically to space (such as radio-frequency pick-up coils in MRI scanners) are protected by shielding.

== Overvoltage protection devices ==
- Arcing horns
- Avalanche diode
- Gas-filled tube
- Lightning rod
- Metal-oxide varistor
- Spark gap
- Transient-voltage-suppression diode
- Trisil
- Zener diode
- Varistor

== See also ==
- Crowbar (circuit)
- Electrical fault
- Electronic countermeasure
- Electrostatic discharge
- Overcurrent
- Dynamic voltage scaling, automatic adjustment of voltage in digital circuits
- Overclocking, where voltages may be purposefully increased
- Undervoltage-lockout
- Uninterruptible power supply

== Sources ==
- Kirby, Brendan J.; Hirst, Eric (1997). Ancillary service details: Voltage control (ORNL/CON-453) (PDF). Oak Ridge, Tennessee: Oak Ridge National Laboratory.
- Li, Jianming (2018-03-13). Measurement and Analysis of Overvoltages in Power Systems. Wiley. doi:10.1002/9781119129035.ch1. ISBN 978-1-119-12899-1.
