= Arcing horns =

Component of the electrical power system

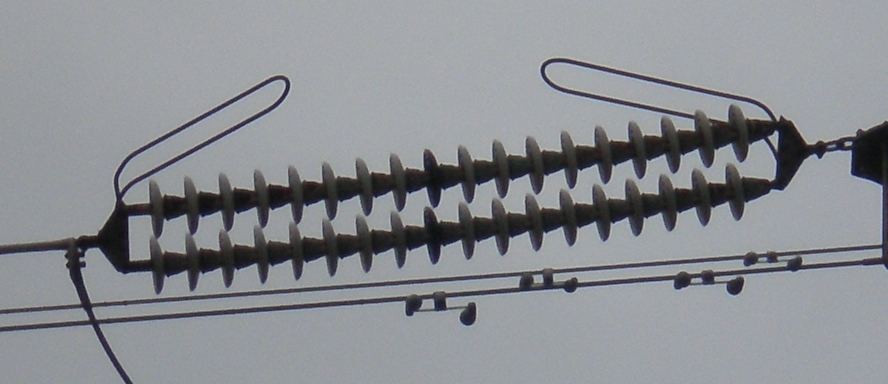
Arcing horns on each side of a tension-type insulator string

Arcing horns (sometimes arc-horns) are projecting conductors used to protect insulators or switch hardware on high voltage electric power transmission systems from damage during flashover by providing a path through the air that is designed to flashover before the insulating surfaces do. Overvoltages on transmission lines, due to atmospheric electricity, lightning strikes, or electrical faults, can cause arcs across insulators (flashovers) that can damage them. Alternately, atmospheric conditions or transients that occur during switching can cause an arc to form in the breaking path of a switch during its operation. Arcing horns provide a path for flashover to occur that bypasses the surface of the protected device. Horns are normally paired on either side of an insulator, one connected to the high voltage part and the other to ground, or at the breaking point of a switch contact. They are frequently to be seen on insulator strings on overhead lines, or protecting transformer bushings.

The horns can take various forms, such as simple cylindrical rods, circular guard rings, or contoured curves, sometimes known as 'stirrups'.

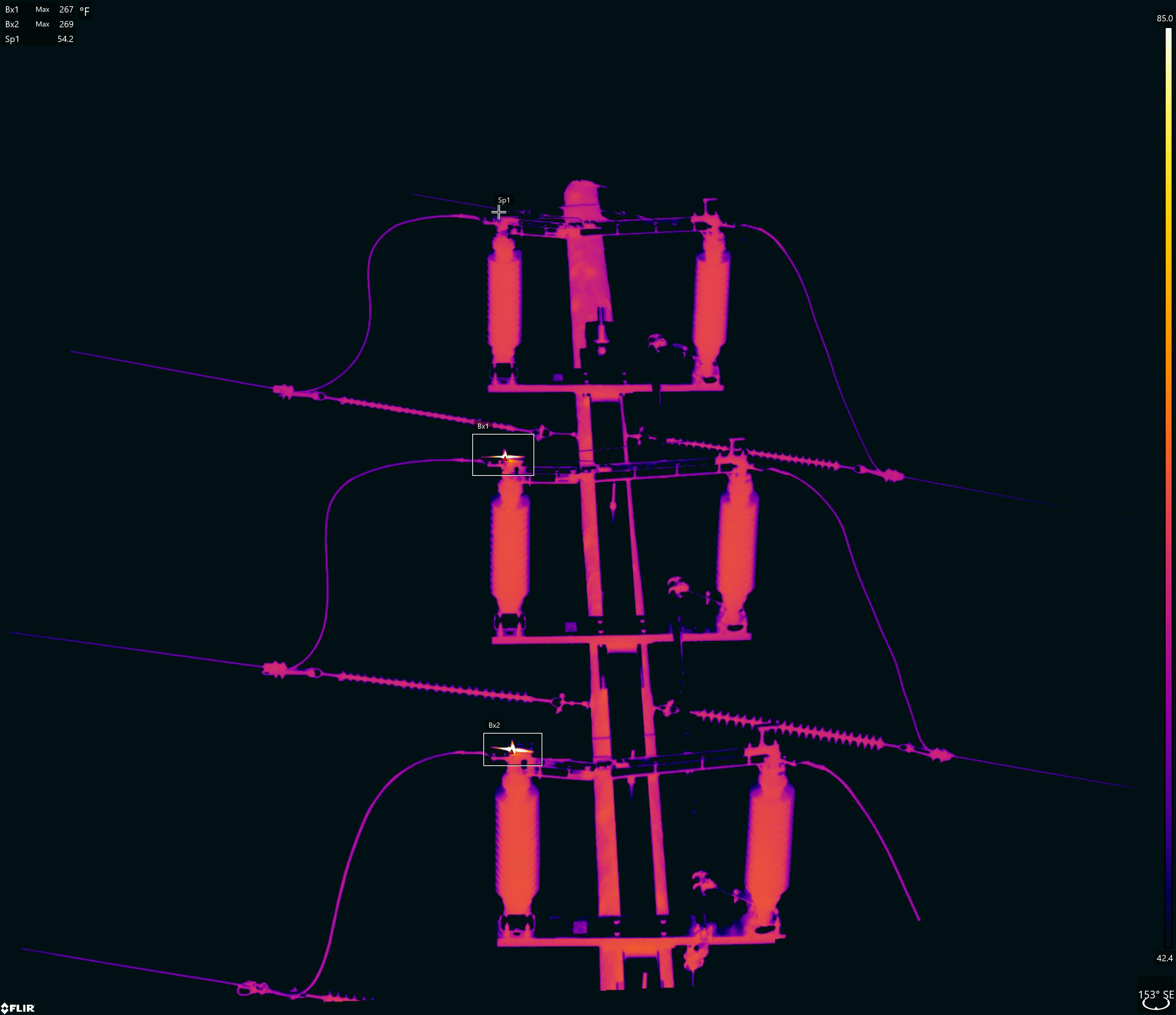
Switch arcing horns are at a resistive state and are not seated correctly.

== Background ==
High voltage equipment, particularly that which is installed outside, such as overhead power lines, is commonly subject to transient overvoltages, which may be caused by phenomena such as lightning strikes, faults on other equipment, or switching surges during circuit re-energisation. Overvoltage events such as these are unpredictable, and in general cannot be completely prevented. Line terminations, at which a transmission line connects to a busbar or transformer bushing, are at greatest risk to overvoltage due to the change in characteristic impedance at this point.

An electrical insulator serves to provide physical separation of conducting parts, and under normal operating conditions is continuously subject to a high electric field which occupies the air surrounding the equipment. Overvoltage events may cause the electric field to exceed the dielectric strength of air and result in the formation of an arc between the conducting parts and over the surface of the insulator. This is called flashover. Contamination of the surface of the insulator reduces the breakdown strength and increases the tendency to flash over. On an electrical transmission system, protective relays are expected to detect the formation of the arc and automatically open circuit breakers to discharge the circuit and extinguish the arc. Under a worst case, this process may take as long as several seconds, during which time the insulator surface would be in close contact with the highly energetic plasma of the arc. This is very damaging to an insulator, it can deposit conductive material on the surface, and may shatter brittle glass or ceramic disks, resulting in complete failure. An arc horn on the other hand may be damaged by the arc, but unless they are eroded away too far to provide a preferable path then they will still protect the insulator.

== Operation ==
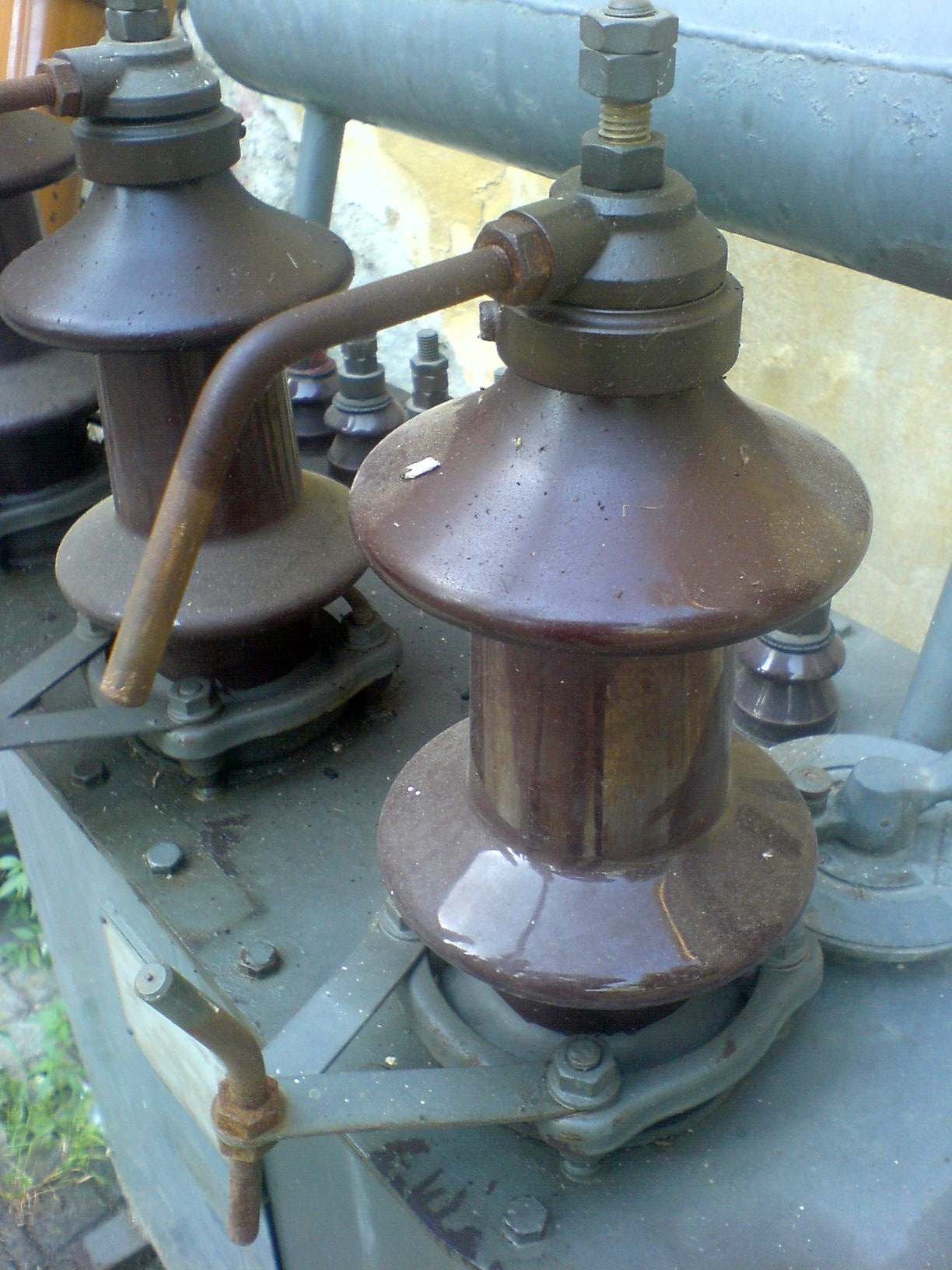
Arcing horns protecting bushings on a distribution transformer

Arcing horns form a spark gap across the insulator with a lower breakdown voltage than the air path along the insulator surface, so an overvoltage will cause the air to break down and the arc to form between the arcing horns, diverting it away from the surface of the insulator. An arc between the horns is more tolerable for the equipment, providing more time for the fault to be detected and the arc to be safely cleared by remote circuit breakers. The geometry of some designs encourages the arc to migrate away from the insulator, driven by rising currents as it heats the surrounding air. As it does so, the path length increases, cooling the arc, reducing the electric field and causing the arc to extinguish itself when it can no longer span the gap. Other designs can utilise the magnetic field produced by the high current to drive the arc away from the insulator. This type of arrangement can be known as a magnetic blowout.

Design criteria and maintenance regimes may treat arcing horns as sacrificial equipment, cheaper and more easily replaced than the insulator, failure of which can result in complete destruction of the equipment it insulates. Failure of insulator strings on overhead lines could result in the parting of the line, with significant safety and cost implications.

Arcing horns thus play a role in the process of correlating system protection with protective device characteristics, known as insulation coordination. The horns should provide, amongst other characteristics, near-infinite impedance during normal operating conditions to minimise conductive current losses, low impedance during the flashover, and physical resilience to the high temperature of the arc.

As operating voltages increase, greater consideration must be given to such design principles. At medium voltages, one of the two horns may be omitted as the horn-to-horn gap can otherwise be small enough to be bridged by an alighting bird. Alternatively, duplex gaps consisting of two sections on opposite sides of the insulator can be fitted. Low voltage distribution systems, in which the risk of arcing is much lower, may not use arcing horns at all.

The presence of the arcing horns necessarily disturbs the normal electric field distribution across the insulator due to their small but significant capacitance. More importantly, a flashover across arcing horns produces an earth fault resulting in a circuit outage until the fault is cleared by circuit breaker operation. For this reason, non-linear resistors known as varistors can replace arcing horns at critical locations.

If the horns are incorrectly seated, damaging resistive heating can occur during arcing.

== Switch protection ==
Arcing horns are sometimes installed on air-insulated switchgear and transformers to protect the switch arm from arc damage. When a high voltage switch breaks a circuit, an arc can establish itself between the switch contacts before the current can be interrupted. The horns are designed to endure the arc rather than the contact surfaces of the switch itself.

== Corona and grading rings ==
Arcing horns are not to be confused with corona rings (or the similar grading rings) which are ring-shaped assemblies surrounding connectors, or other irregular hardware pieces on high potential equipment. Corona rings and grading rings are intended to equalize and redistribute accumulated potential away from components that might be subject to local accumulation and destructive discharges, although sometimes either device may be installed in close proximity to an arcing horn assembly.
