= Trisil =

Electronic component

Trisil is a trade name for a thyristor surge protection device, an electronic component designed to protect electronic circuits from overvoltage. Unlike a transient voltage suppression diodes, such as Transil, Trisil acts as a crowbar device, switching on when the voltage across it exceeds its breakover voltage.

== Overview ==
A Trisil is bidirectional, behaving the same way in both directions. It is principally a voltage-controlled triac without gate. The behavior of a Trisil is similar to a SIDAC, but unlike SIDAC, Trisil devices are commonly used to protect circuits from overvoltage.They act faster and can handle more current. In 1982, the only manufacturer was Thomson SA; a successor company, ST Microelectronics continues to make the devices.

This type of crowbar protector is widely used to protect telecom equipment from lightning-induced transients and power line-induced currents. Other manufacturers of similar devices include Bourns (TISP) and Littelfuse (SIDACtor). Instead of relying on the device's natural breakdown voltage, an additional region is fabricated within the device to form a Zener diode. This provides much tighter control over the breakdown voltage.

Gated versions of these protectors can also be manufactured. In such cases, the gate is connected to the telecom circuit's power supply (via a diode or transistor), causing the device to activate if the transient voltage exceeds the power supply voltage. The primary advantage of this configuration is that the protection voltage follows the power supply voltage, eliminating the need to select a specific breakdown voltage for the protection circuit.

== See also ==
- Transil
- Zener diode
