= Avalanche diode =

Type of diode

- Component type: Passive
- Working principle: Avalanche breakdown

In electronics, an avalanche diode is a diode (made from silicon or other semiconductor) that is designed to experience avalanche breakdown at a specified reverse bias voltage. The junction of an avalanche diode is designed to prevent current concentration and resulting hot spots, so that the diode is undamaged by the breakdown. The avalanche breakdown is due to minority carriers accelerated enough to create ionization in the crystal lattice, producing more carriers, which in turn create more ionization. Because the avalanche breakdown is uniform across the whole junction, the breakdown voltage is nearly constant with changing current when compared to a non-avalanche diode.

The Zener diode exhibits an apparently similar effect in addition to Zener breakdown. Both effects are present in any such diode, but one usually dominates the other. Avalanche diodes are optimized for avalanche effect, so they exhibit small but significant voltage drop under breakdown conditions, unlike Zener diodes that always maintain a voltage higher than breakdown. This feature provides better surge protection than a simple Zener diode and acts more like a gas-discharge tube replacement. Avalanche diodes have a small positive temperature coefficient of voltage, whereas diodes relying on the Zener effect have a negative temperature coefficient.

== Uses ==
Avalanche diode current vs. voltage characteristic

=== Voltage reference ===
The voltage after breakdown varies only slightly with changing current. This makes the avalanche diode useful as a type of voltage reference. Voltage reference diodes rated more than about 6–8 volts are generally avalanche diodes.

=== Protection ===
A common application is to protect electronic circuits against damaging high voltages. The avalanche diode is connected to the circuit so that it is reverse-biased. In other words, its cathode is positive with respect to its anode. In this configuration, the diode is non-conducting and does not interfere with the circuit. If the voltage increases beyond the design limit, the diode goes into avalanche breakdown, causing the harmful voltage to be conducted to ground. When used in this fashion, they are often referred to as clamping diodes or transient-voltage suppressors because they fix or "clamp" the maximum voltage to a predetermined level. Avalanche diodes are normally specified for this role by their clamping voltage V_{BR} and the maximum amount of transient energy they can absorb, specified by either energy (in joules) or $i^2rt$. Avalanche breakdown is not destructive as long as the diode is prevented from overheating.

=== Radio-frequency noise generation ===
Avalanche diodes generate radio-frequency noise. They are commonly used as noise sources in radio equipment and hardware random number generators. For instance, they are often used as a source of RF for antenna analyzer bridges. Avalanche diodes can also be used as white noise generators.

=== Microwave-frequency generation ===
If placed into a resonant circuit, avalanche diodes can act as negative-resistance devices. The IMPATT diode is an avalanche diode optimized for frequency generation.

=== Single-photon avalanche detector ===
These are made from doped silicon and depend on the avalanche breakdown effect to detect even single photons. The silicon avalanche photodiode is a high-gain photon detector. They are "ideal for use in high-speed, low-light-level applications". The avalanche photodiode is operated with a reverse bias voltage of up to hundreds of volts, slightly below its breakdown voltage. In this regime, electron–hole pairs generated by the incident photons take a large amount of energy from the electric field, which creates more secondary charge carriers. The photocurrent of just one photon can be registered with these electronic devices.

== See also ==
- Avalanche transistor
- Transient-voltage-suppression diode
