= Electron tube =

Electron tube may refer to:

- Vacuum tube, a device that controls electric current between electrodes
- Gas-filled tube, an arrangement of electrodes in a gas
