= Trigatron =

High-voltage switch used to discharge electrical energy

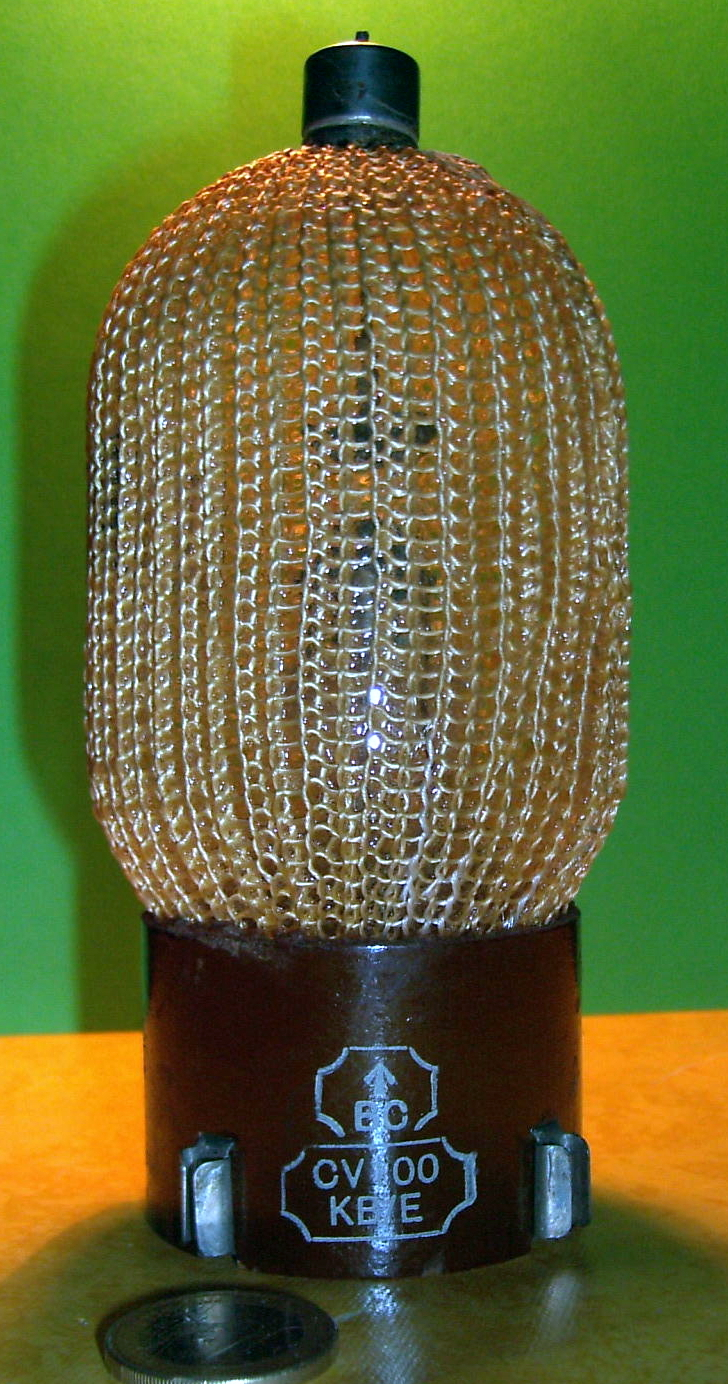
Trigatron CV100, with loose-knit "sock" to contain any explosion

A trigatron is a type of triggerable spark gap switch designed for high current and high voltage (usually 10–100 kV and 20–100 kA, though devices in the mega-ampere range exist as well). It has very simple construction and in many cases is the lowest cost high energy switching option. It may operate in open air, it may be sealed, or it may be filled with a dielectric gas other than air or a liquid dielectric. The dielectric gas may be pressurized, or a liquid dielectric (e.g. mineral oil) may be substituted to further extend the operating voltage. Trigatrons may be rated for repeated use (over 10,000 switching cycles), or they may be single-shot, destroyed in a single use.

A trigatron has three electrodes. The heavy main electrodes are for the high current switching path, and a smaller third electrode serves as the trigger. During normal operation, the voltage between the main electrodes is somewhat lower than the breakdown voltage corresponding to their distance and the dielectric between them (usually air, argon-oxygen, nitrogen, hydrogen, or sulfur hexafluoride). To switch the device, a high-voltage pulse is delivered to the triggering electrode. This ionizes the medium between it and one of the main electrodes, creating a spark which shortens the thickness of non-ionized medium between the electrodes. The triggering spark also generates ultraviolet light and free electrons in the main gap. These lead to the rapid electrical breakdown of the main gap, culminating in a low resistance electric arc between the main electrodes. The arc will continue to conduct until current flow drops sufficiently to extinguish it.

The triggering electrode is most often mounted through a hole in the center of the positive main electrode. The undrilled main electrode is the negative electrode. When switching high currents, the electrodes undergo considerable heat stress, as they are directly involved in the electric arc. This causes the surfaces to undergo gradual vaporization, so some designs incorporate methods to easily adjust the distance between the electrodes or to actually replace the electrodes. The main electrodes are typically fabricated from brass, copper or its alloys, tungsten, or copper–tungsten composite, to achieve longer electrode life.

The trigger pulse is most often delivered by a trigger transformer. Some trigatron units have trigger modules integrated; others use external ones. The trigger transformer secondary can be galvanically isolated from its primary side. Some manufacturers offer trigger modules controlled by an optical fiber, which isolates the control circuitry from the electromagnetic interference effects of the sharp and intense electrical pulses. The trigger pulse from the transformer output is typically a narrow spike of very high voltage, with relatively small energy compared to the energy controlled by the trigatron.

The energy for the trigger pulse is usually derived from a capacitor, which may be charged from the power source of the trigatron's own circuit. In this regard, the entire circuit is very similar to a flashtube based photoflash, where the trigger transformer provides the ionization in the tube and the tube functions simultaneously as the light source and the power switching element for itself. An air-gap flash type, where the flash gap itself contains a trigger electrode and acts as a switch, is a form of a trigatron with the same dual function.

Trigatrons are often enclosed in resin-impregnated loose-knit fabric "socks", to contain fragments if the device explodes due to internal overpressure.

Trigatrons find many uses in pulsed power applications. For example, they were used in early radar modulators to feed the high-power pulses into the magnetrons, for use with slapper detonators, or for triggering a Marx generator.

== See also ==
- Crossatron
- Thyratron
- Krytron
