= Pulsed power =

Power released by a short pulse

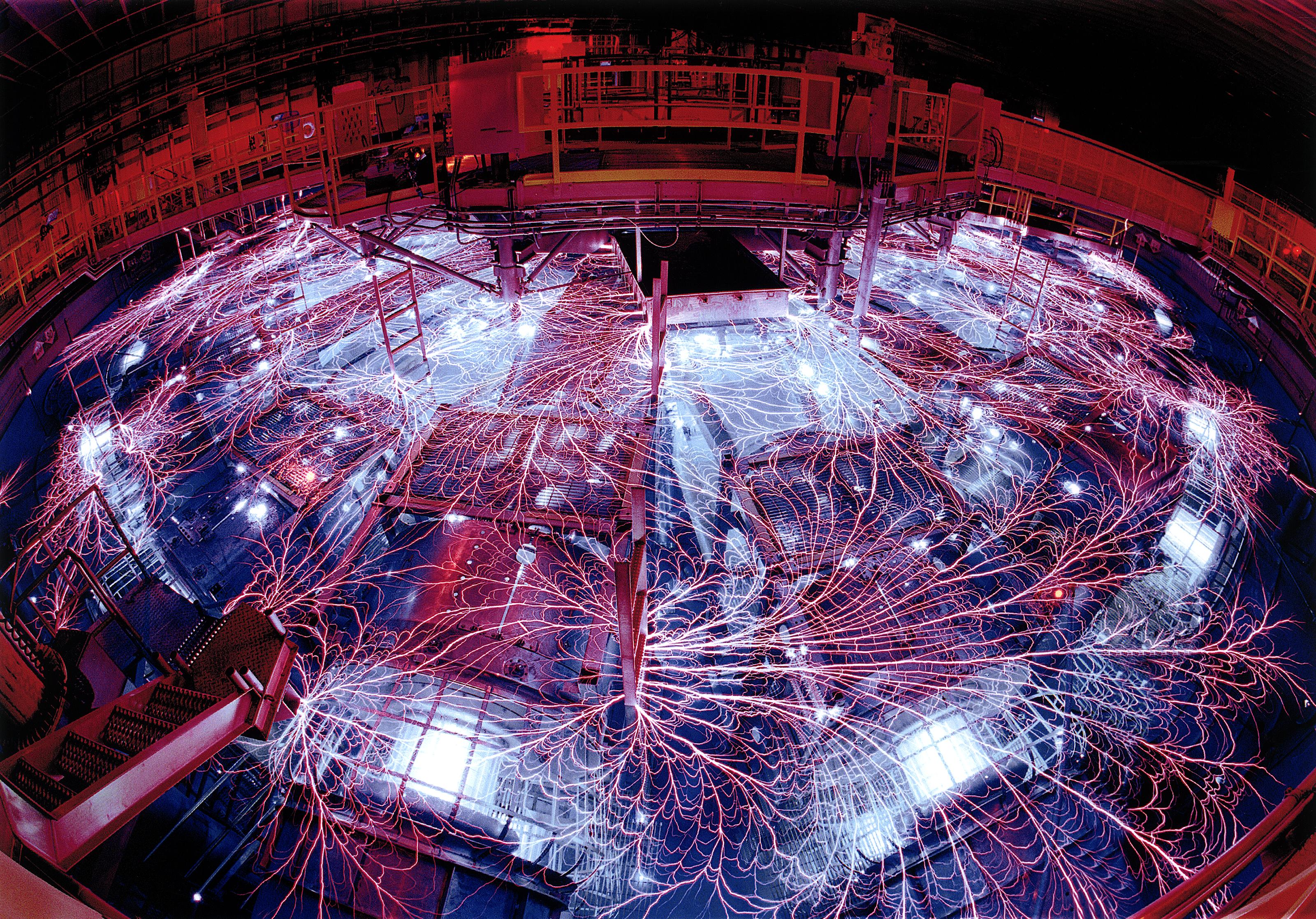
A time-exposure photograph of electrical flash-over arcs produced over the surface of the water in the accelerator tank as a byproducts of Z operation. These flash-overs are much like strokes of lightning. The Z pulsed power accelerator at Sandia, which began operating in September 1996, is the world's most powerful and efficient laboratory X-ray source. It is a modified version of the PBFA II accelerator which was used until 1996 for light ion fusion research.

Pulsed power is the science and technology of accumulating energy over a relatively long period of time and releasing it instantly, thus increasing the instantaneous power. They can be used in some applications such as food processing, water treatment, weapons, and medical applications.

== Overview ==
Energy is typically stored as electric potential energy within capacitors, or in the case of explosive pulsed power, as chemical energy. The stored energy is released over a very short time scale resulting in a large amount of power being delivered to a load which can be used to study high energy density physics phenomena such as inertial confinement fusion using a Z-pinch, and plasma physics or to create electromagnetic radiation.

Some electrically driven pulsed power accelerators make use of pulse-forming lines to compress the current pulse before reaching the load, as is often the case when Marx generators are used as the prime power source. Other circuit architectures such as linear transformer drivers or impedance-matched Marx generators typically do not require any pulse compression.

== Maximum power records ==
Single pulse energies as high as 100 MJ, power as high as a "few hundred terawatts" with voltages between 10 kV and 50 MV, and currents between 1 kA and 10 MA, have been achieved at least as of 2006.

== Applications ==
=== Fusion energy ===
Pulsed power systems are used in inertial confinement fusion research, most notably at the Z Pulsed Power Facility at Sandia National Laboratories, which uses Z-pinch implosions for nuclear stockpile stewardship science. The MagLIF (magnetized liner inertial fusion) program on Z has achieved the second-highest fusion triple product recorded.

Several private companies are also developing pulsed power systems for commercial fusion power, including Pacific Fusion, Fuse, and First Light Fusion.

=== Other ===
Railguns utilise pulsed power to quickly accelerate an object.

== See also ==
- Crossatron – Type of gas-filled tube used as a pulsed modulator device
- Dipole magnet – Simplest type of magnet "kicker"
- Electromagnetic forming – Metal forming process
- Electromagnetic pulse – Burst of electromagnetic energy (EMP)
- Explosively pumped flux compression generator – Non-nuclear device that creates an electromagnetic pulse
- Ignitron – Gas-filled tube used as a rectifier
- Linear transformer driver
- Magnetic pulse welding – Metal welding process
- Particle accelerator – Research apparatus for particle physics
- Power (physics) – Amount of energy transferred or converted per unit time
- Pulse-forming network – Type of electric circuit
- Thyratron – Gas-filled tube, electrical switch, rectifier
- Triggered spark gap – Two conducting electrodes separated in order to allow an electric spark to pass between
- National Ignition Facility – American nuclear fusion facility; Pulsed laser facility
