= Ignitron =

Gas-filled tube used as a rectifier

(1) Anode, (2) Cathode, (3) Ignitor, (4) Mercury, (5) Ceramic insulators, (6) Cooling fluid

An ignitron is a type of gas-filled tube used as a controlled rectifier and switch dating from the 1930s. Invented by Joseph Slepian while employed by Westinghouse, Westinghouse was the original manufacturer and owned trademark rights to the name "Ignitron". Ignitrons are closely related to mercury-arc valves but differ in the way the arc is ignited. They function similarly to thyratrons; a triggering pulse to the igniter electrode turns the device "on", allowing a high current to flow between the cathode and anode electrodes. After it is turned on, the current through the anode must be reduced to zero to restore the device to its nonconducting state. They are used to switch high currents in heavy industrial applications.

== Construction and operation ==
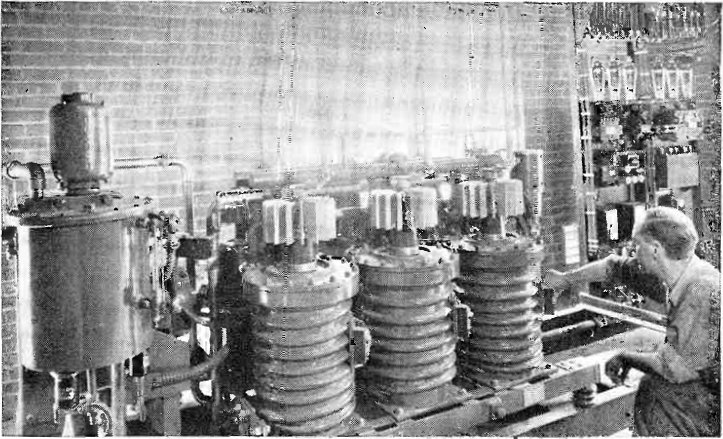
Ignitron rectifiers powering industrial process, 1945

An ignitron is usually a large steel container with a pool of mercury in the bottom that acts as a cathode during operation. A large graphite or refractory metal cylinder, held above the pool by an insulated electrical connection, serves as the anode. An igniting electrode (called the ignitor), made of a refractory semiconductor material such as silicon carbide, is briefly pulsed with a high current to create a puff of electrically conductive mercury plasma. The plasma rapidly bridges the space between the mercury pool and the anode, permitting heavy conduction between the main electrodes. At the surface of the mercury, heating by the resulting arc liberates large numbers of electrons which help to maintain the mercury arc. The mercury surface thus serves as the cathode, and current is normally only in one direction. Once ignited, an ignitron will continue to pass current until either the current is externally interrupted or the voltage applied between cathode and anode is reversed.

== Applications ==
Ignitrons were long used as high-current rectifiers in major industrial and utility installations where thousands of amperes of AC must be converted to DC, such as aluminum smelters. Ignitrons were used to control the current in electric welding machines. Large electric motors were also controlled by ignitrons used in gated fashion, in a manner similar to modern semiconductor devices such as silicon controlled rectifiers and triacs. Many electric locomotives used them in conjunction with transformers to convert high voltage AC from the overhead lines to relatively low voltage DC for the traction motors. The Pennsylvania Railroad's E44 freight locomotives carried on-board ignitrons, as did the Russian ВЛ-60 freight locomotive. For many modern applications, ignitrons have been replaced by solid state alternatives.

Because they are far more resistant to damage due to overcurrent or back-voltage, ignitrons are still manufactured and used in preference to semiconductors in some installations. For example, specially constructed "pulse rated" ignitrons are still used in certain pulsed power applications. These devices can switch hundreds of kiloamperes and hold off as much as 50 kV. The anodes in these devices are often fabricated from a refractory metal, usually molybdenum, to handle reverse current during ringing (or oscillatory) discharges without damage. Pulse rated ignitrons usually operate at very low duty cycles. They are often used to switch high energy capacitor banks during electromagnetic forming, electrohydraulic forming, or for emergency short-circuiting of high voltage power sources ("crowbar" switching).

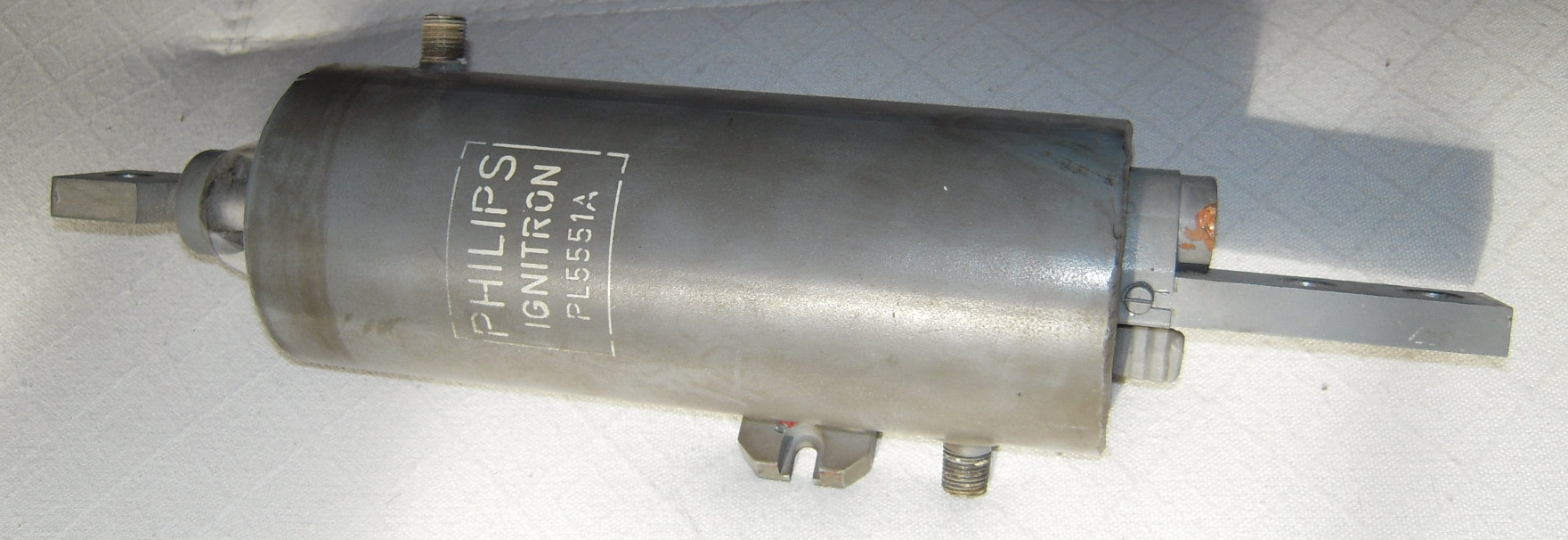
An ignitron rated 56 amperes. Cooling jacket connections visible. In use the device was mounted so that the text would be upright.

== Comparison with mercury-arc valve ==
Although the basic principles of how the arc is formed, along with many aspects of construction, are very similar to other types of mercury-arc valves, ignitrons differ from other mercury-arc valves in that the arc is ignited each time a conduction cycle is started, and then extinguished when the current falls below a critical threshold.

In other types of mercury-arc valve, the arc is ignited just once when the valve is first energised, and thereafter remains permanently established, alternating between the main anode(s) and a low-power auxiliary anode or keep-alive circuit. Moreover, control grids are required in order to adjust the timing of the start of conduction.

The action of igniting the arc at a controlled time, each cycle, allows the ignitron to dispense with the auxiliary anode and control grids required by other mercury-arc valves. However, a disadvantage is that the ignition electrode must be positioned very accurately, just barely touching the surface of the mercury pool, which means that ignitrons must be installed very accurately within a few degrees of an upright position.

== See also ==
- Excitron
- Trigatron
- Thyratron
- Thyristor
- Krytron
- Triggered spark gap
- Pulsed power
- Mercury-arc valve
