= Crossatron =

Type of gas-filled tube used as a pulsed modulator device

In electronics, a crossatron is a high-power pulsed modulator device that consists of a cold cathode gas-filled tube that combines features of thyratrons, vacuum tubes, and power semiconductor switches. This switch is capable of operating with voltages in excess of 100 kilovolts by the use of deuterium gas fill to increase the Paschen breakdown voltage, axial molybdenum cathode corrugations to provide a higher current capability, and a Paschen shield that is formed from molybdenum. The terminal curvature of the Paschen shield and of the adjacent portion of the anode are selected to establish a voltage stress at the curved Paschen shield surface within the approximate range of 90–150 kV/cm in response to a 100 kV differential. The cold cathode gives the crossatron an advantage of achievable lifetime and reliability in comparison to a hydrogen-filled thyratron.

It features fast start-up speeds and operates well when enduring high temperatures, high radiation, electromagnetic pulse, and repeated overvoltage and overcurrent events. Crossatron switch applications in power conditioning include high-voltage phase-control-rectifier service, high-frequency DC-to-AC inverter modulation, voltage regulation, command charging, and fault protection. Pulsed power applications include high-speed discharging of capacitors and pulse-forming networks, repetitive opening of inductive-energy-storage circuits, modulation of square wave pulses in hard-tube modulators, and fault protection.
