= Dekatron =

Obsolete electronic device for counting in decimal

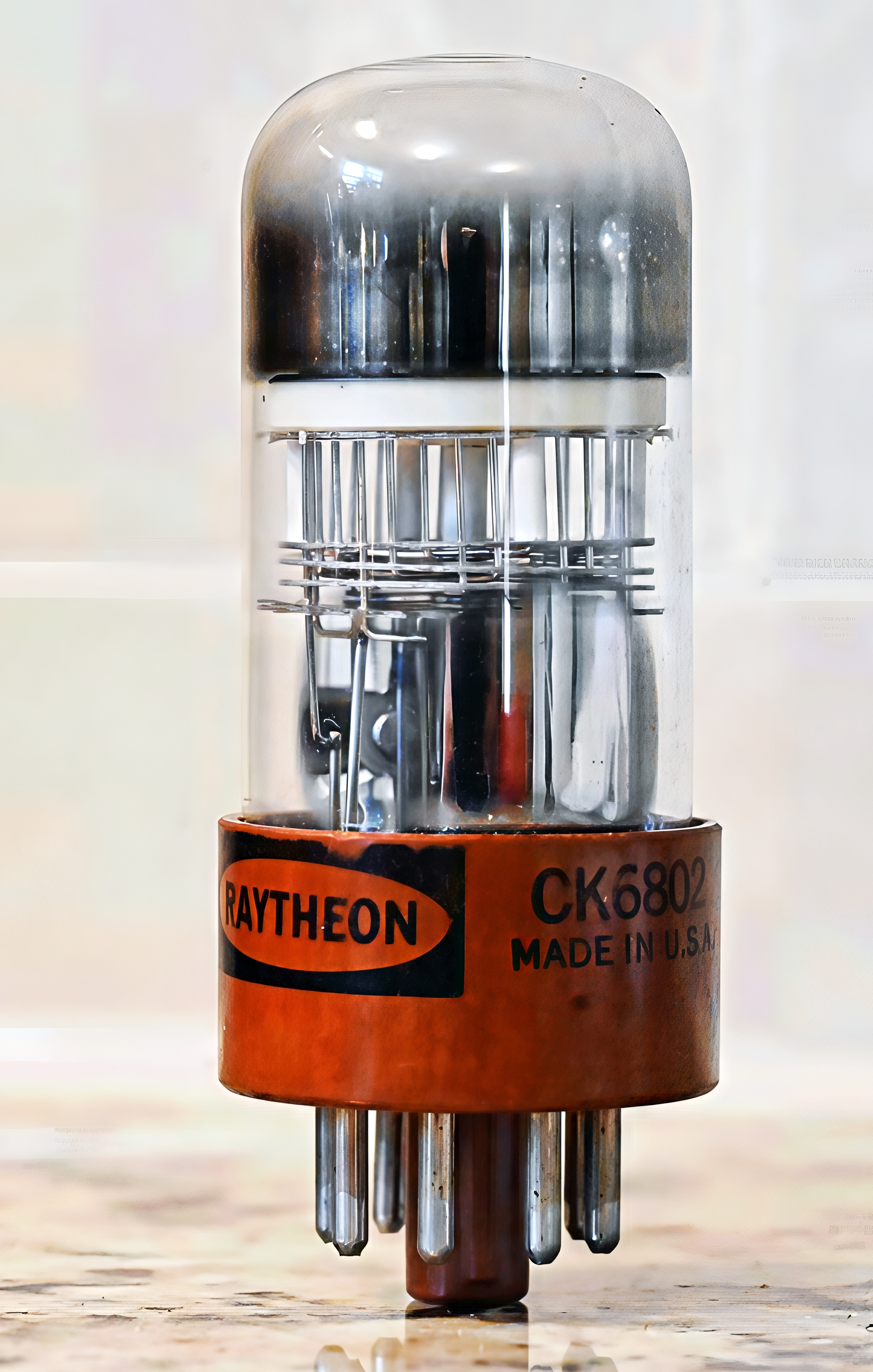
- Octal-base dekatron
- Working principle: Cold cathode
- Inventor: 1949

In electronics, a Dekatron (or Decatron, or generically three-phase gas counting tube or glow-transfer counting tube or cold cathode tube) is a gas-filled decade counting tube. Dekatrons were used in computers, calculators, and other counting-related products during the 1950s and 1960s. "Dekatron" was the brand name used by Ericsson Telephones Limited (ETL), of Beeston, Nottingham (not to be confused with the Swedish TelefonAB Ericsson of Stockholm) and has since become a generic trademark. The device was invented by John Reginald Acton, with the patent assigned to Ericsson.

The dekatron was useful for computing, calculating, and frequency-dividing purposes because one complete revolution of the neon dot in a dekatron usually means 10 pulses on the guide electrode(s), and a signal can be derived from one of the cathodes in a dekatron to send a pulse, possibly for another counting stage. Dekatrons usually have a maximum input frequency in the high kilohertz (kHz) range – 100 kHz is fast, 1 MHz is around the maximum possible. These frequencies are obtained in hydrogen-filled fast dekatrons. Dekatrons filled with inert gas are inherently more stable and have a longer life, but their counting frequency is limited to 10 kHz (1–2 kHz is more common).

== Design and operation ==
A dekatron in operation

Internal designs vary by the model and manufacturer, but generally, a dekatron has ten cathodes and one or two guide electrodes plus a common anode. The cathodes are arranged in a circle with a guide electrode (or two) between each cathode. When the guide electrode(s) is pulsed properly, the neon gas will activate near the guide pins and then "jump" to the next cathode. Pulsing the guide electrodes (negative going pulses) repeatedly will cause the neon dot to move from cathode to cathode.

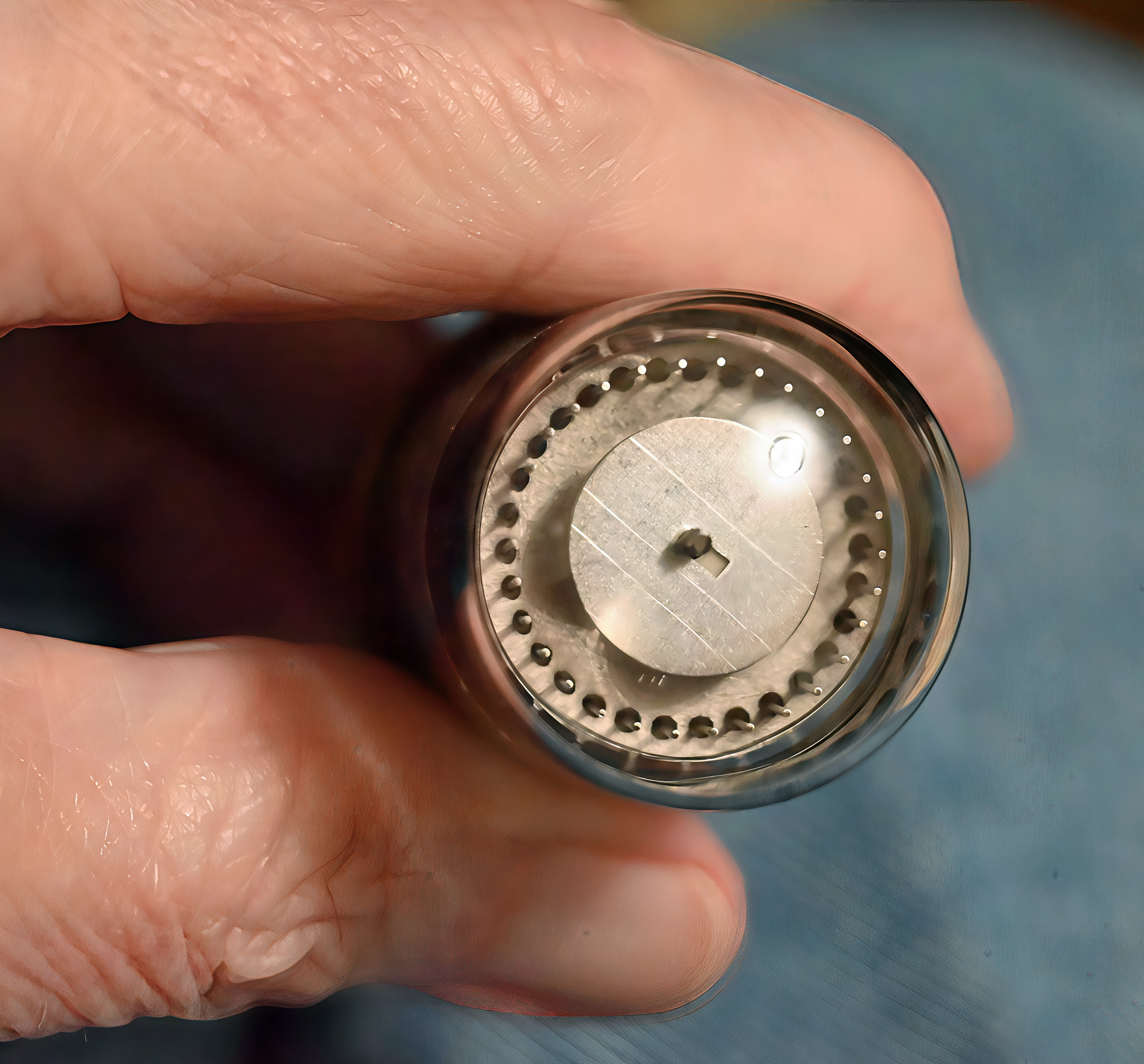
Detail of the top of a dekatron: central anode disk surrounded by 30 internal cathode pins

Sending sequenced pulses to guide electrodes will govern the direction of movement.

Hydrogen dekatrons require high voltages ranging from 400 to 600 volts on the anode for proper operation; dekatrons with inert gas usually require ~350 volts. When a dekatron is first powered up, a glowing dot appears at a random cathode; the tube must then be reset to zero state, by driving a negative pulse into the designated starting cathode. The color of the dot depends on the type of gas that is in the tube. Neon-filled tubes display a red-orange dot; argon-filled tubes display a purple dot (and are much dimmer than neon).

Counter (common-cathode) dekatrons have only one carry/borrow cathode wired to its own socket pin for multistage cascading and the remaining nine cathodes tied together to another pin; therefore they do not need bases with more than nine pins.

Counter/Selector (separate-cathode) dekatrons have each cathode wired to its own pin; therefore their bases have at least 13 pins. Selectors allow for monitoring the status of each cathode or to divide-by-n with the proper reset circuitry. This kind of versatility made such dekatrons useful for numerical division in early calculators.

Dekatrons come in various physical sizes, ranging from smaller than a 7-pin miniature vacuum tube to as large as an octal base tube. While most dekatrons are decimal counters, models were also made to count in base-5 and base-12 for specific applications.

The dekatron fell out of practical use when transistor-based counters became reliable and affordable. Today, dekatrons are used by electronic hobbyists in simple "spinners" that run off the mains frequency (50 Hz or 60 Hz) or as a numeric indicator for homemade clocks.

== See also ==
- Sumlock ANITA calculator – The world's first desktop electronic calculators, which used Dekatrons
- The Harwell computer – Early (1952) British relay-based computer that used Dekatrons (later also known as the WITCH)
- Ericsson Telephones computing tubes designation system
- Special Quality gas-filled tubes designation system
