= Thyratron =

Gas-filled tube, electrical switch, rectifier

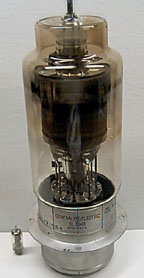
Giant GE hydrogen thyratron, used in pulsed radars, next to miniature 2D21 thyratron used to trigger relays in jukeboxes. Reference 2D21 tube is 2 1/8 in (54 mm) tall.

A thyratron is a type of gas-filled tube used as a high-power electrical switch and controlled rectifier. Thyratrons can handle much greater currents than similar hard-vacuum tubes. Electron multiplication occurs when the gas becomes ionized, producing a phenomenon known as a Townsend discharge. Gases used include mercury vapor, xenon, neon, and (in special high-voltage applications or applications requiring very short switching times) hydrogen. Unlike a vacuum tube (valve), a thyratron cannot be used to amplify signals linearly.

In the 1920s, thyratrons were derived from early vacuum tubes such as the UV-200, which contained a small amount of argon gas to increase its sensitivity as a radio signal detector, and the German LRS relay tube, which also contained argon gas. Gas rectifiers, which predated vacuum tubes, such as the argon-filled General Electric "Tungar bulb" and the Cooper-Hewitt mercury-pool rectifier, also provided an influence. Irving Langmuir and G. S. Meikle of GE are usually cited as the first investigators to study controlled rectification in gas tubes, about 1914. The first commercial thyratrons appeared circa 1928.

The term "thyratron" is derived from Ancient Greek "θύρα" ("thyra"), meaning "door" or "valve". The term "thyristor" was further derived from a combination of "thyratron" and "transistor". Since the 1960s thyristors have replaced thyratrons in most low- and medium-power applications.

== Description ==
Most commonly used symbols in the US and Europe of a thyratron (variations are usually related to the representation of the filament and the cathode)

Thyratrons resemble vacuum tubes both in appearance and construction but differ in behavior and operating principle. In a vacuum tube, conduction is dominated by free electrons because the distance between anode and cathode is small compared to the mean free path of electrons. A thyratron, on the other hand, is intentionally filled with gas so that the distance between anode and cathode is comparable with the mean free path of electrons. This causes conduction in a thyratron to be dominated by plasma conductivity. Due to the high conductivity of plasma, a thyratron is capable of switching higher currents than vacuum tubes which are limited by space charge. A vacuum tube has the advantage that conductivity may be modulated at any time whereas a thyratron becomes filled with plasma and continues to conduct as long as a voltage exists between the anode and cathode. A pseudospark switch operates in a similar regime of the Paschen curve as a thyratron and is sometimes called a cold cathode thyratron.

A thyratron consists of a hot cathode, an anode, and one or more control grids between the anode and cathode in an airtight glass or ceramic envelope that is filled with gas. The gas is typically hydrogen or deuterium at a pressure of 300 to 500 mTorr (40 to 70 Pa). Commercial thyratrons also contain a titanium hydride reservoir and a reservoir heater that together maintain gas pressure over long periods regardless of gas loss.

Conductivity of a thyratron remains low as long as the control grid is negative relative to the cathode because the grid repels electrons emitted by the cathode. Space charge limited electron current flows from the cathode through the control grid toward the anode if the grid is made positive relative to the cathode. Sufficiently high space charge limited current initiates Townsend discharge between anode and cathode. The resulting plasma provides high conductivity between anode and cathode and is not limited by space charge. Conductivity remains high until the current between anode and cathode drops to a small value for a sufficiently long time that the gas ceases to be ionized. This recovery process takes 25 to 75 μs and limits thyratron repetition rates to a few kHz.

== Applications ==
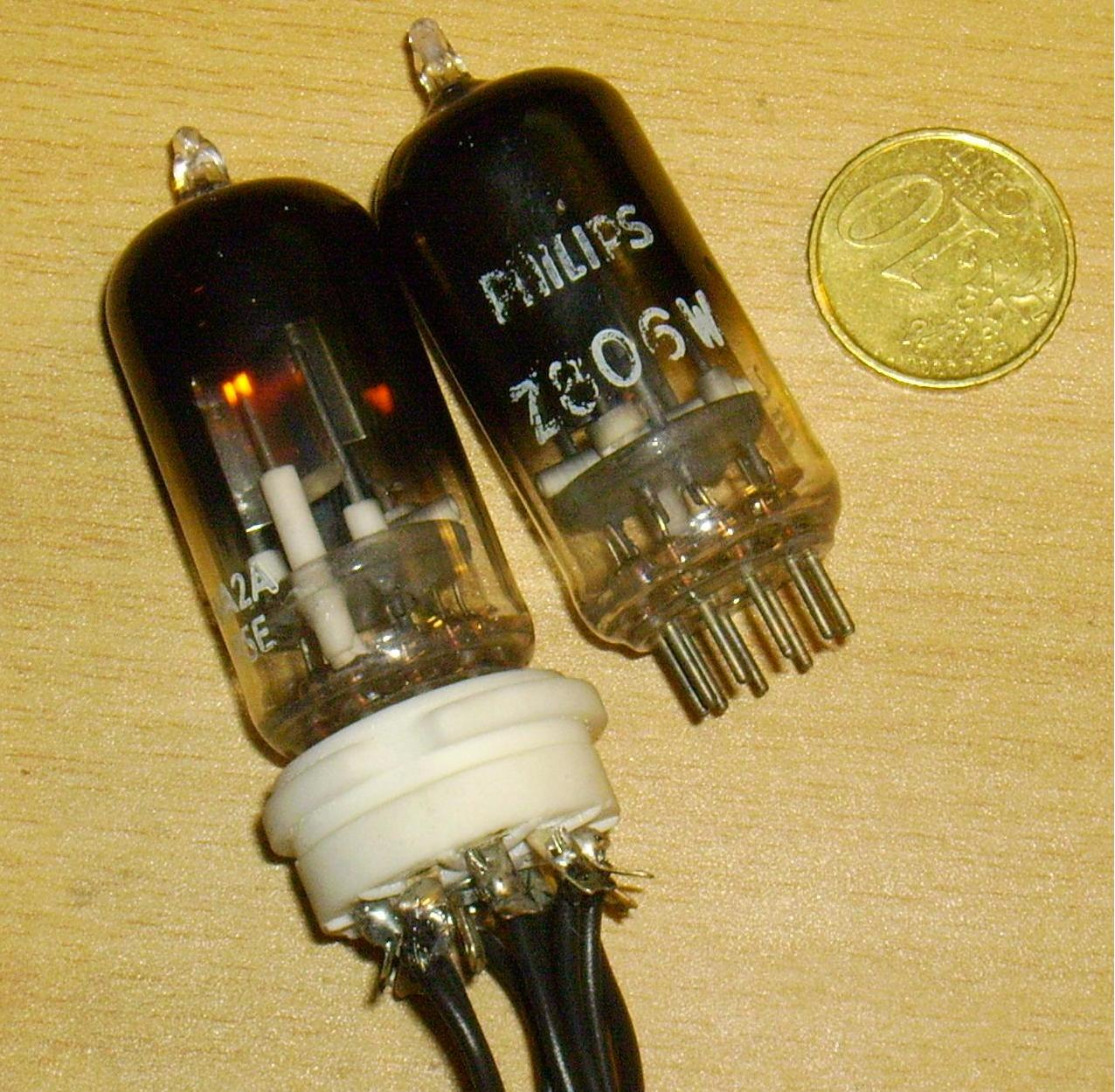
Rare Z806W relay tube used in elevators

Low-power thyratrons (relay tubes and trigger tubes) were manufactured for controlling incandescent lamps, electromechanical relays or solenoids, for bidirectional counters, to perform various functions in Dekatron calculators, for voltage threshold detectors in RC timers, etc. Glow thyratrons were optimized for high gas-discharge light output or even phosphorized and used as self-displaying shift registers in large-format, crawling-text dot-matrix displays.

Another use of the thyratron was in relaxation oscillators. Since the plate turn-on voltage is much higher than the turn-off voltage, the tube exhibits hysteresis and, with a capacitor across it, it can function as a sawtooth oscillator. The voltage on the grid controls the breakdown voltage and thus the period of oscillation. Thyratron relaxation oscillators were used in power inverters and oscilloscope sweep circuits.

One miniature thyratron, the triode 6D4, found an additional use as a potent noise source, when operated as a diode (grid tied to cathode) in a transverse magnetic field. Sufficiently filtered for "flatness" ("white noise") in a band of interest, such noise was used for testing radio receivers, servo systems and occasionally in analog computing as a random value source.

The miniature RK61/2 thyratron marketed in 1938 was designed specifically to operate like a vacuum triode below its ignition voltage, allowing it to amplify analog signals as a self-quenching superregenerative detector in radio control receivers, and was the major technical development which led to the wartime development of radio-controlled weapons and the parallel development of radio controlled modelling as a hobby.

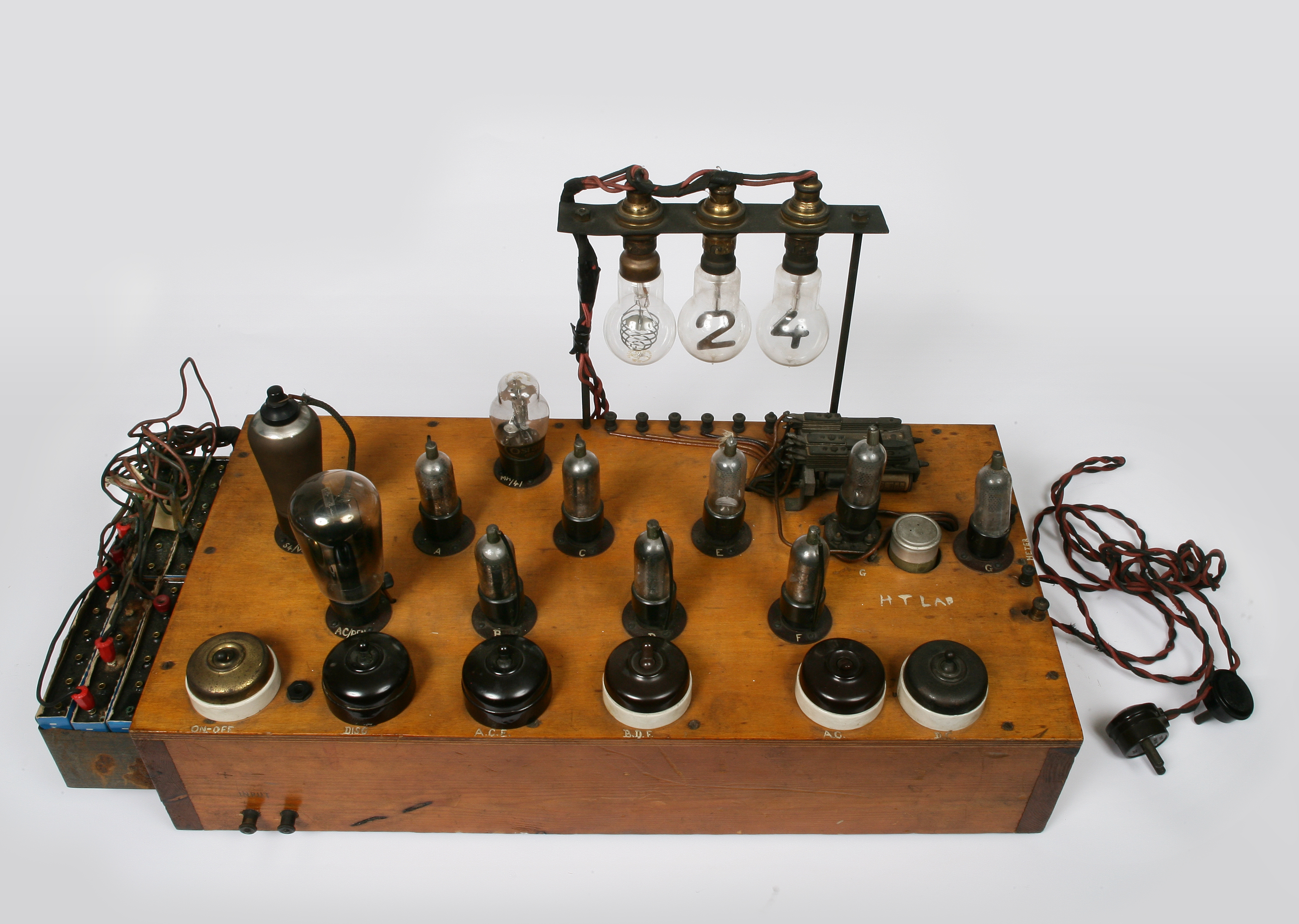
Wynn-Williams's scale-of-two counter using thyratrons (with permission of the Cavendish Laboratory, University of Cambridge, UK.)

Some early television sets, particularly British models, used thyratrons for vertical (frame) and horizontal (line) oscillators.

Medium-power thyratrons found applications in machine tool motor controllers, where thyratrons, operating as phase-controlled rectifiers, are utilized in the tool's armature regulator (zero to "base speed", "constant torque" mode) and in the tool's field regulator ("base speed" to about twice "base speed", "constant horsepower" mode). Examples include Monarch Machine Tool 10EE lathe, which used thyratrons from 1949 until solid-state devices replaced them in 1984.

High-power thyratrons are still manufactured, and are capable of operation up to tens of kiloamperes (kA) and tens of kilovolts (kV). Modern applications include pulse drivers for pulsed radar equipment, high-energy gas lasers, radiotherapy devices, particle accelerators and in Tesla coils and similar devices. Thyratrons are also used in high-power UHF television transmitters, to protect inductive output tubes from internal shorts, by grounding the incoming high-voltage supply during the time it takes for a circuit breaker to open and reactive components to drain their stored charges. This is commonly called a crowbar circuit.

Thyratrons have been replaced in most low and medium-power applications by corresponding semiconductor devices known as thyristors (sometimes called silicon-controlled rectifiers, or SCRs) and triacs. However, switching service requiring voltages above 20 kV and involving very short risetimes remains within the domain of the thyratron.

Variations of the thyratron idea are the krytron, the sprytron, the ignitron, and the triggered spark gap, all still used today in special applications, such as nuclear weapons (krytron) and AC/DC-AC power transmission (ignitron).

== Example of a small thyratron ==
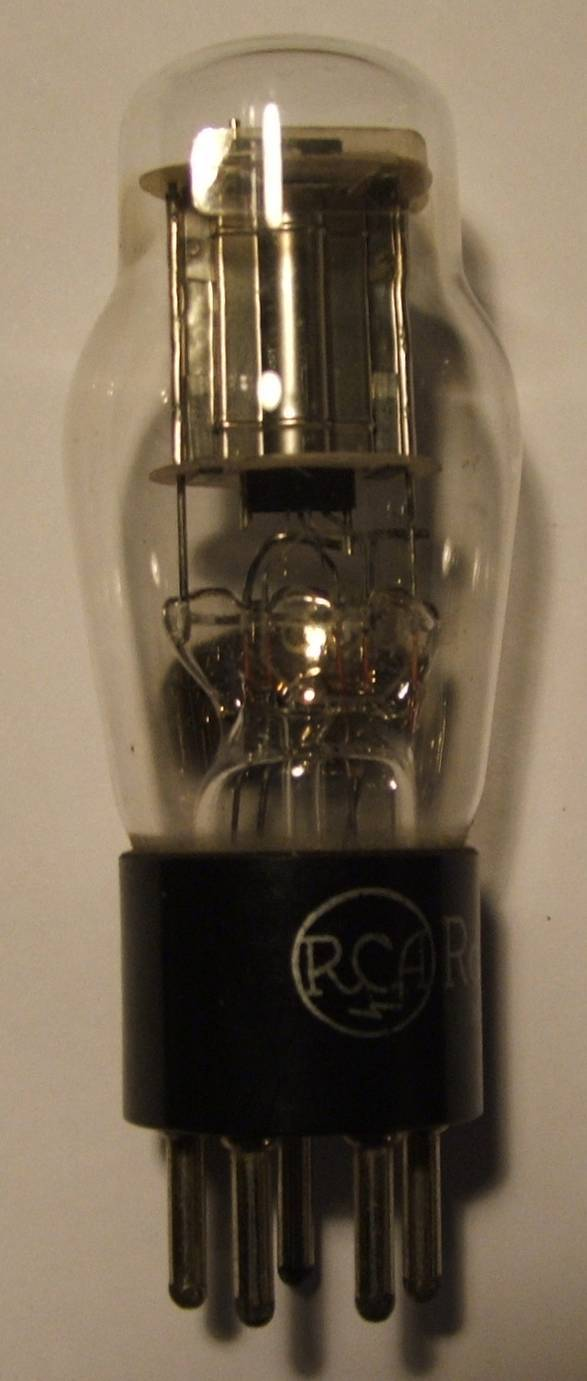
R.C.A. brand 885 Triode Thyratron

The 885 is a small thyratron tube, using argon gas. This device was used extensively in the timebase circuits of early oscilloscopes in the 1930s. It was employed in a circuit called a relaxation oscillator. During World War II, small thyratrons similar to the 885 were utilized in pairs to construct bistables, the "memory" cells used by early computers and code breaking machines. Thyratrons were also used for phase angle control of alternating current (AC) power sources in battery chargers and light dimmers, but these were usually of a larger current handling capacity than the 885. The 885 is a 2.5 volt, 5-pin based variant of the 884/6Q5.

== See also ==
- Krytron
- Triggered spark gap
