= Applications of capacitors =

Uses of capacitors in daily life

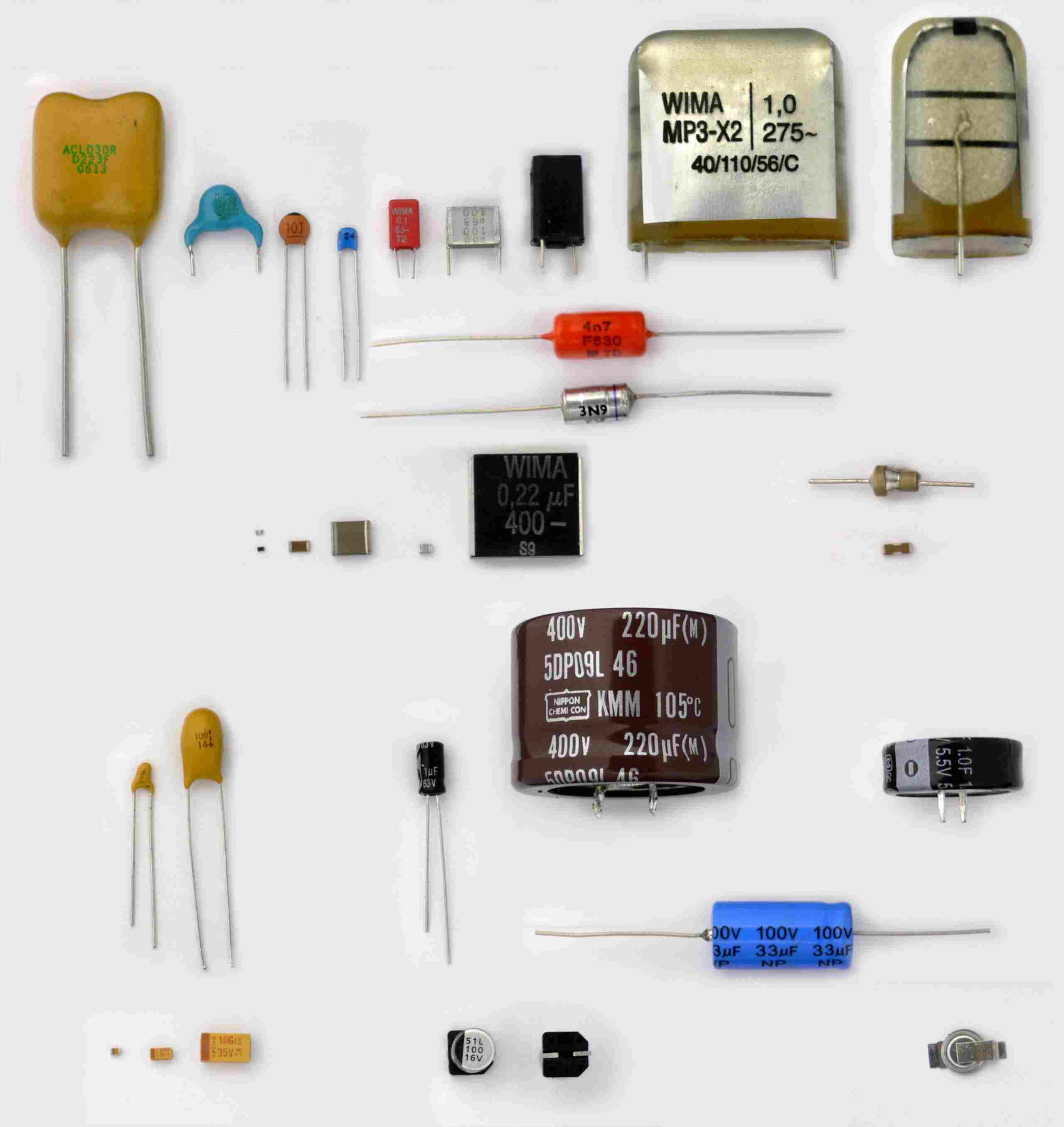
Some different capacitors for electronic equipment

Capacitors have many uses in electronic and electrical systems. They are so ubiquitous that it is rare that an electrical product does not include at least one for some purpose. Capacitors allow only AC signals to pass when they are charged blocking DC signals. The main components of filters are capacitors. Capacitors have the ability to connect one circuit segment to another. Capacitors are used by Dynamic Random Access Memory (DRAM) devices to represent binary information as bits.

== Energy storage ==
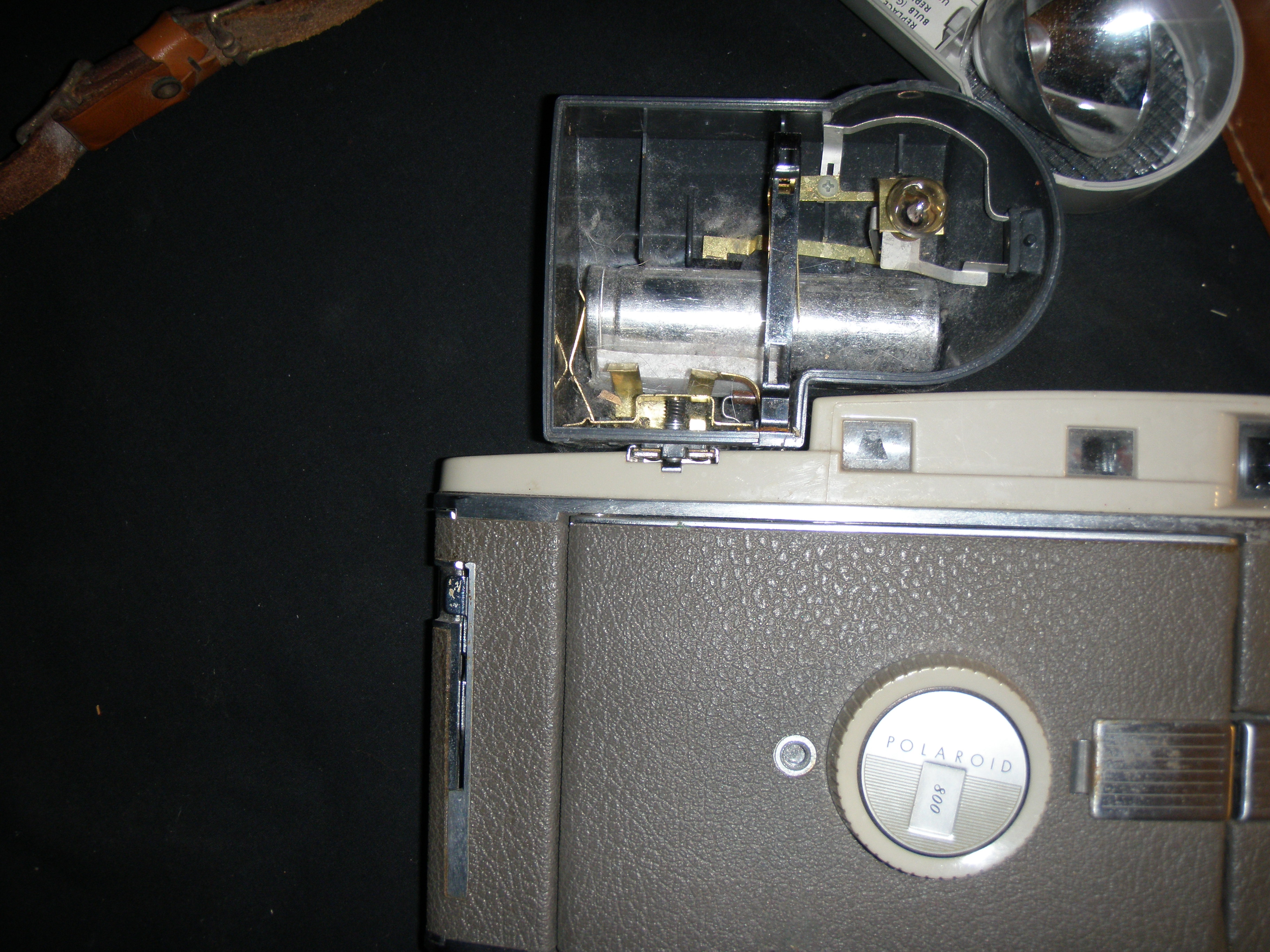
Energy storage capacitor for camera flash in a vintage Polaroid

A capacitor can store electric energy when it is connected to its charging circuit and when it is disconnected from its charging circuit, it can dissipate that stored energy, so it can be used as a temporary battery. Capacitors are commonly used in electronic devices to maintain power supply while batteries are being changed. (This prevents loss of information in volatile memory.)

Conventional electrostatic capacitors provide less than 360 joules per kilogram of energy density, while capacitors using developing technology can provide more than 2.52 kilo joules per kilogram.

In car audio systems, large capacitors store energy for the amplifier to use on demand.

An uninterruptible power supply (UPS) can be equipped with maintenance-free capacitors to extend service life.

== Pulsed power and weapons ==
Groups of large, specially constructed, low-inductance high-voltage capacitors (capacitor banks) are used to supply huge pulses of current for many pulsed power applications. These include electromagnetic forming, Marx generators, pulsed lasers (especially TEA lasers), pulse forming networks, fusion research, and particle accelerators.

Large capacitor banks (reservoirs) are used as energy sources for the exploding-bridgewire detonators or slapper detonators in nuclear weapons and other specialty weapons. Experimental work is under way using banks of capacitors as power sources for electromagnetic armour and electromagnetic railguns or coilguns.

== Power conditioning ==
Reservoir capacitors are used in power supplies where they smooth the output of a full or half wave rectifier. They can also be used in charge pump circuits as the energy storage element in the generation of higher voltages than the input voltage.

Capacitors are connected in parallel with the DC power circuits of most electronic devices to smooth current fluctuations for signal or control circuits. Audio equipment, for example, uses several capacitors in this way, to shunt away power line hum before it gets into the signal circuitry. The capacitors act as a local reserve for the DC power source, and bypass AC currents from the power supply. This is used in car audio applications, when a stiffening capacitor compensates for the inductance and resistance of the leads to the lead-acid car battery.

== Power factor correction ==
In electric power distribution, capacitors are used for power factor correction. Such capacitors often come as three capacitors connected as a three-phase Electrical load. Usually, the values of these capacitors are given not in farads but rather as a reactive power in volt-amperes reactive (VAr). The purpose is to counteract inductive loading from devices like Induction motors, electric motors and transmission lines to make the load appear primarily resistive. Individual motor or lamp loads may have capacitors for power factor correction, or larger sets of capacitors (usually with automatic switching devices) may be installed at a load centre within a building or in a large utility electrical substation. In high-voltage direct current transmission systems, power factor correction capacitors may have tuning inductors to suppress harmonic currents that would otherwise be injected into the AC power system.

== Suppression and coupling ==
Capacitors used for suppressing undesirable frequencies are sometimes called filter capacitors. They are common in electrical and electronic equipment, and cover a number of applications, such as:

- Glitch removal on direct current (DC) power rails
- Radio frequency interference (RFI) removal for signal or power lines entering or leaving equipment
- Capacitors used after a voltage regulator to further smooth DC power supplies
- Capacitors used in audio, intermediate frequency (IF) or radio frequency (RF) filters (e.g. low pass, high pass, notch, etc.)
- Arc suppression, such as across the contact breaker or 'points' in a spark-ignition engine

=== Signal coupling ===
Because capacitors pass AC but block DC signals (when charged up to the applied DC voltage), they are often used to separate the AC and DC components of a signal. This method is known as AC coupling or "capacitive coupling". Here, a large value of capacitance, whose value need not be accurately controlled, but whose reactance is small at the signal frequency, is employed.

=== Decoupling ===
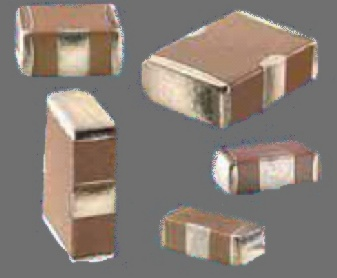
Ceramic X2Y decoupling capacitors

A decoupling capacitor is a capacitor used to decouple one part of a circuit from another. Noise caused by other circuit elements is shunted through the capacitor, reducing the effect they have on the rest of the circuit. It is most commonly used between the power supply and ground. For higher frequencies an alternative name is bypass capacitor as it is used to bypass the power supply or other high impedance component of a circuit.

=== High-pass and low-pass filters ===
A high-pass filter (HPF) is an electronic filter that passes signals with a frequency higher than a certain cutoff frequency and attenuates signals with frequencies lower than the cutoff frequency. The amount of attenuation for each frequency depends on the filter design. A high-pass filter is usually modeled as a linear time-invariant system. It is sometimes called a low-cut filter or bass-cut filter.[1] High-pass filters have many uses, such as blocking DC from circuitry sensitive to non-zero average voltages or radio frequency devices. They can also be used in conjunction with a low-pass filter to produce a bandpass filter.

A low-pass filter (LPF) is a filter that passes signals with a frequency lower than a selected cutoff frequency and attenuates signals with frequencies higher than the cutoff frequency. The exact frequency response of the filter depends on the filter design. The filter is sometimes called a high-cut filter, or treble-cut filter in audio applications. A low-pass filter is the complement of a high-pass filter.

=== Noise filters and snubbers ===
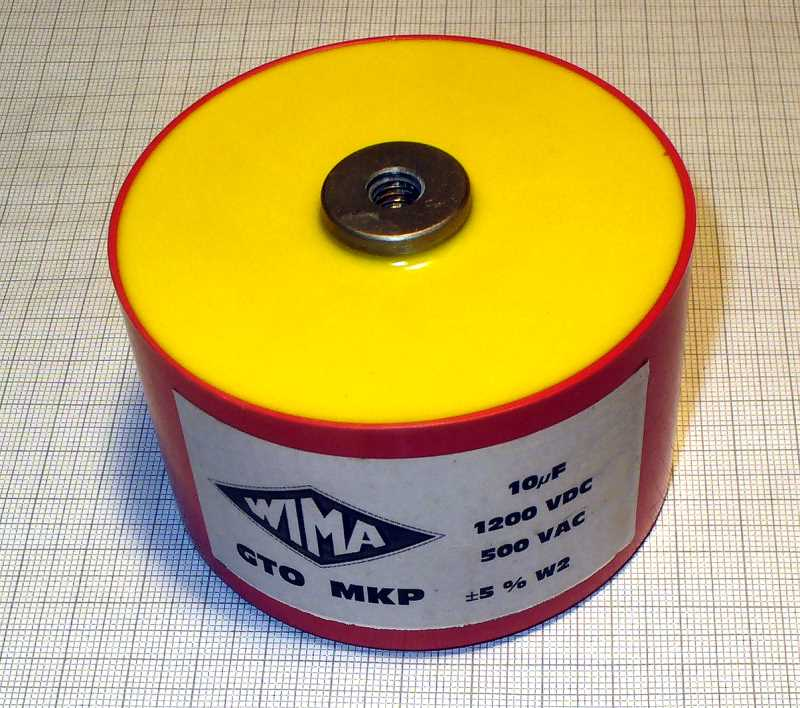
Heavy-duty snubber capacitor with screw terminals

When an inductive circuit is opened, the current through the inductance collapses quickly, creating a large voltage across the open circuit of the switch or relay. If the inductance is large enough, the energy will generate an electric spark, causing the contact points to oxidize, deteriorate, or sometimes weld together, or destroy a solid-state switch. A snubber capacitor across the newly opened circuit creates a path for this impulse to bypass the contact points, thereby preserving their life; these were commonly found in contact breaker ignition systems, for instance. Similarly, in smaller scale circuits, the spark may not be enough to damage the switch but will still radiate undesirable radio frequency interference (RFI), which a filter capacitor absorbs. Snubber capacitors are usually employed with a low-value resistor in series, to dissipate energy and minimize RFI. Such resistor-capacitor combinations are available in a single package.

Capacitors are also used in parallel to interrupt units of a high-voltage circuit breaker to distribute the voltage between these units equally. In this case, they are called grading capacitors.

In schematic diagrams, a capacitor used primarily for DC charge storage is often drawn vertically in circuit diagrams with the lower, more negative, plate drawn as an arc. The straight plate indicates the positive terminal of the device if it is polarized (see electrolytic capacitor).

==== DC motor suppression ====
Ceramic disc capacitors are usually used in snubber circuits for low voltage motors for their low inductance and low cost.

==== Switched mode power supply filtering ====
Low ESR (equivalent series resistance) electrolytes are often required to handle the high ripple current.

=== Mains filtering ===
Mains filter capacitors are usually encapsulated wound-plastic-film types, since these deliver high voltage rating at low cost, and may be made self-healing and fusible. Mains filter capacitors are often ceramic RFI/EMI suppression capacitors. The additional safety requirements for mains filtering are:

- Line to neutral capacitors are flame retardant, and in Europe are required to use class X dielectrics.
- Line or neutral to earth: Must be flame retardant; also, the dielectric must be self healing and fusible. In Europe these are class Y capacitors.

=== Power rail filtering ===
Typical application circuit for a simple mains PSU, showing transformer, bridge rectifier, 78xx regulator and filter capacitors

Electrolytic capacitors are usually used due to high capacity at low cost and low size. Smaller non-electrolytics may be paralleled with these to compensate for electrolytics' poor performance at high frequencies.

Computers use large numbers of filter capacitors, making size an important factor. Solid tantalum and wet tantalum capacitors offer some of the best CV (capacitance/voltage) performance in some of the most volumetrically efficient packaging available. High currents and low voltages also make low equivalent series resistance (ESR) important. Solid tantalum capacitors offer low ESR versions that can often meet ESR requirements but they are not the lowest ESR option among all capacitors. Solid tantalums have an additional issue which must be addressed during the design stage. Solid tantalum capacitors must be voltage derated in all applications. A 50% voltage derating is recommended and generally accepted as the industry standard; e.g. a 50V solid tantalum capacitor should never be exposed to an actual application voltage above 25V. Solid tantalum capacitors are very reliable components if the proper care is taken and all design guidelines are carefully followed. Unfortunately, the failure mechanism for a solid tantalum capacitor is a short which will result in a violent flaring up and smoking on a PCB capable of damaging other components in close proximity as well as completely destroying the capacitor. Fortunately, most solid tantalum capacitor failures will be immediate and very evident. Once in application solid tantalum capacitor performance will improve over time and the chances of a failure due to component mis-manufacturing decrease. Wet tantalums are a type of the electrolytic capacitor, using a tantalum pellet in an electrolytic material sealed in a hermetic package. This type of tantalum capacitor does not require the same derating that a solid tantalum does and its failure mechanism is open. A 10% to 20% voltage derating curve is recommended for wet tantalums when operating from 85C to 125C. Wet tantalums are not commonly referred to as just 'electrolytics' because usually 'electrolytic' refers to aluminium electrolytics.

== Motor starters ==
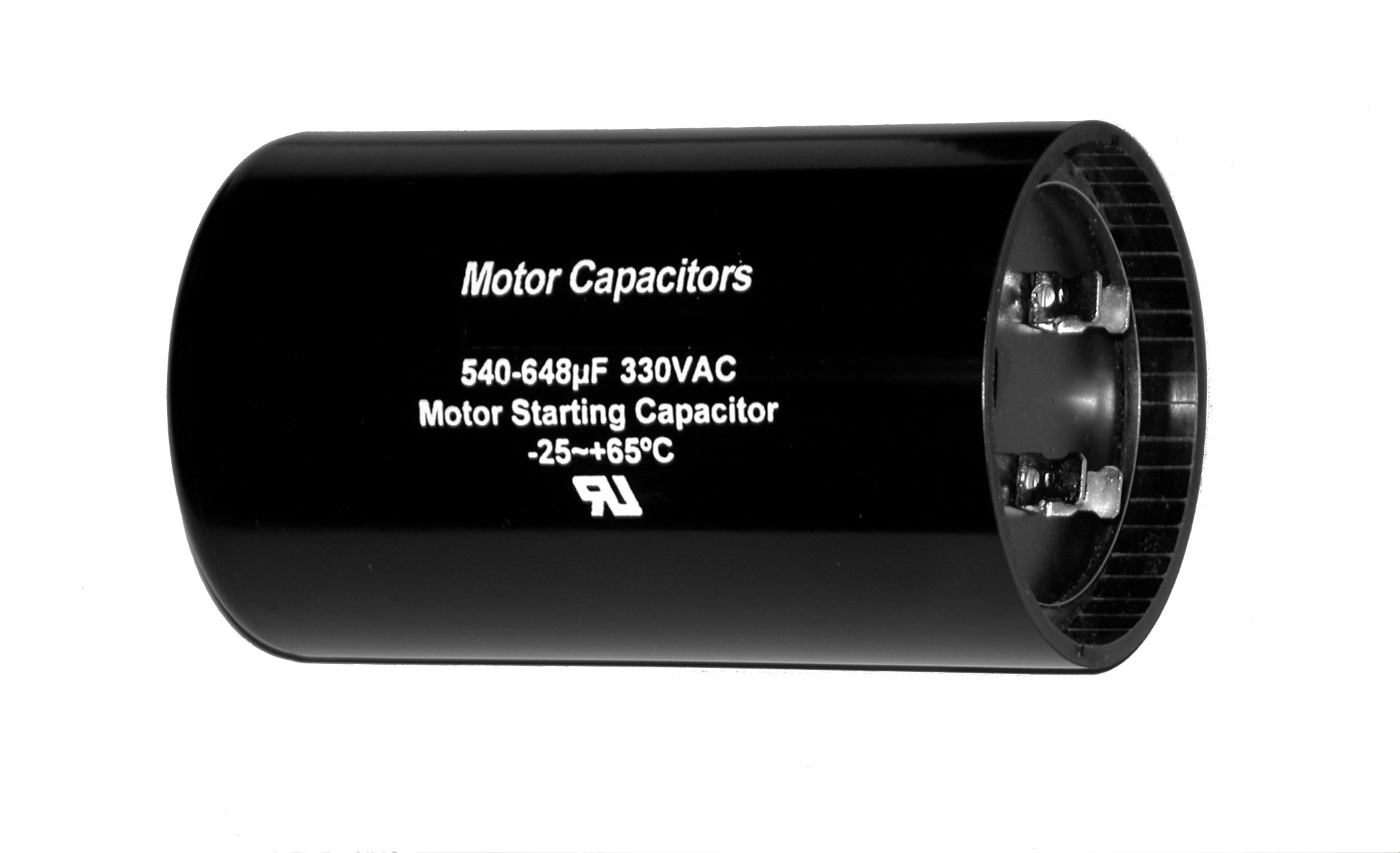
A typical motor start capacitor, as can be seen by its black color and can shape

In single phase squirrel cage motors, the primary winding within the motor housing is not capable of starting a rotational motion on the rotor, but is capable of sustaining one. To start the motor, a secondary winding is used in series with a non-polarized starting capacitor to introduce a lag in the sinusoidal current through the starting winding. When the secondary winding is placed at an angle with respect to the primary winding, a rotating electric field is created. The force of the rotational field is not constant, but is sufficient to start the rotor spinning. When the rotor comes close to operating speed, a centrifugal switch (or current-sensitive relay in series with the main winding) disconnects the capacitor. The start capacitor is typically mounted to the side of the motor housing. These are called capacitor-start motors, and have relatively high starting torque.

There are also capacitor-run induction motors which have a permanently connected phase-shifting capacitor in series with a second winding. The motor is much like a two-phase induction motor.

Motor-starting capacitors are typically non-polarized electrolytic types, while running capacitors are conventional paper or plastic film dielectric types.

=== Signal processing ===
The energy stored in capacitor can be used to represent information, either in binary form, as in DRAMs, or in analogue form, as in analog sampled filters and Charge-coupled device CCDs. Capacitors can be used in analog circuits as components of integrators or more complex filters and in negative feedback loop stabilization. Signal processing circuits also use capacitors to integrate a current signal.

=== Tuned circuits ===
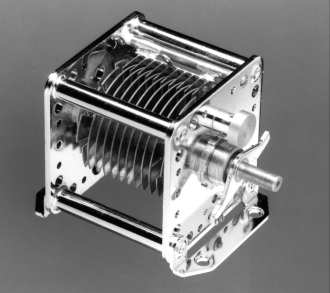
Air gap tuning capacitor

Capacitors and inductors are applied together in tuned circuits to select information in particular frequency bands. For example, radio receivers rely on variable capacitors to tune the station frequency. Speakers use passive analog crossovers, and analog equalizers use capacitors to select different audio bands.

== Sensing ==
Most capacitors are designed to maintain a fixed physical structure. However, various factors can change the structure of the capacitor; the resulting change in capacitance can be used to sense those factors.

=== Changing the dielectric ===
The effects of varying the characteristics of the dielectric can also be used for sensing and measurement. Capacitors with an exposed and porous dielectric can be used to measure humidity in air. Capacitors are used to accurately measure the fuel level in airplanes; as the fuel covers more of a pair of plates, the circuit capacitance increases.

=== Changing the distance between the plates ===
A capacitor with a flexible plate can be used to measure strain or pressure or weight.

Industrial pressure transmitters used for process control use pressure-sensing diaphragms, which form a capacitor plate of an oscillator circuit. Capacitors are used as the sensor in condenser microphones, where one plate is moved by air pressure, relative to the fixed position of the other plate. Some accelerometers use microelectromechanical systems (MEMS) capacitors etched on a chip to measure the magnitude and direction of the acceleration vector. They are used to detect changes in acceleration, e.g. as tilt sensors or to detect free fall, as sensors triggering airbag deployment, and in many other applications. Some fingerprint sensors use capacitors.

=== Changing the effective area of the plates ===
Capacitive touch switches are now used on many consumer electronic products

== Oscillators ==
Example of a simple oscillator that requires a capacitor to function

A capacitor can possess spring-like qualities in an oscillator circuit. In the image example, a capacitor acts to influence the biasing voltage at the npn transistor's base. The resistance values of the voltage-divider resistors and the capacitance value of the capacitor together control the oscillatory frequency.

== Hazards and safety ==
Capacitors may retain a charge long after power is removed from a circuit; this charge can cause dangerous or even potentially fatal shocks or damage connected equipment. For example, even a seemingly innocuous device such as a disposable camera flash unit powered by a 1.5 volt AA battery contains a capacitor which may be charged to over 300 volts. This is easily capable of delivering a shock. Service procedures for electronic devices usually include instructions to discharge large or high-voltage capacitors. Capacitors may also have built-in discharge resistors to dissipate stored energy to a safe level within a few seconds after power is removed. High-voltage capacitors are stored with the terminals shorted, as protection from potentially dangerous voltages due to dielectric absorption.

Some old, large oil-filled capacitors contain polychlorinated biphenyls (PCBs). It is known that waste PCBs can leak into groundwater under landfills. Capacitors containing PCB were labelled as containing "Askarel" and several other trade names. PCB-filled capacitors are found in very old (pre 1975) fluorescent lamp ballasts, and other applications.

High-voltage capacitors may catastrophically fail when subjected to voltages or currents beyond their rating, or as they reach their normal end of life. Dielectric or metal interconnection failures may create arcing that vaporizes dielectric fluid, resulting in case bulging, rupture, or even an explosion. Capacitors used in RF or sustained high-current applications can overheat, especially in the center of the capacitor rolls. Capacitors used within high-energy capacitor banks can violently explode when a short in one capacitor causes sudden dumping of energy stored in the rest of the bank into the failing unit. High voltage vacuum capacitors can generate soft X-rays even during normal operation. Proper containment, fusing, and preventive maintenance can help to minimize these hazards.

High-voltage capacitors can benefit from a pre-charge to limit in-rush currents at power-up of high voltage direct current (HVDC) circuits. This will extend the life of the component and may mitigate high-voltage hazards.

== See also ==
- Glitch removal
