= Contact protection =

Concept in switch design

Contact protection methods are designed to mitigate the wear and degradation occurring during the normal use of contacts within an electromechanical switch, relay or contactor and thus avoid an excessive increase in contact resistance or switch failure.

== Contact wear ==
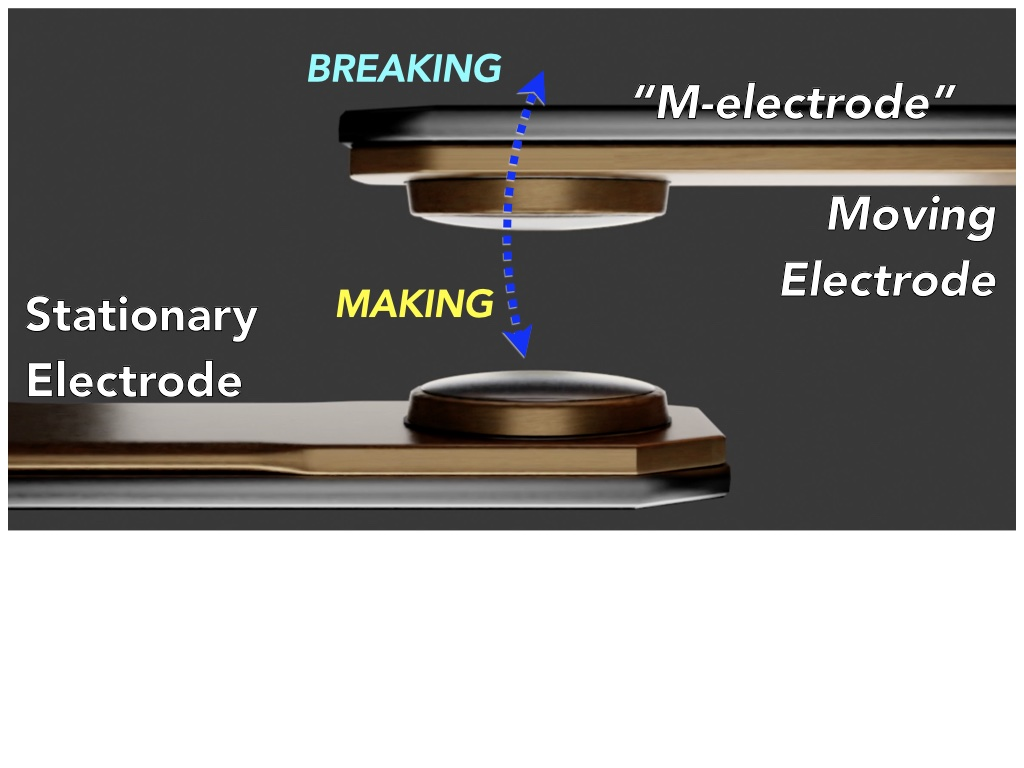
Typical contact elements of an electromechanical relay or contactor.

A “contact” is a pair of electrodes (typically, one moving; one stationary) designed to control electricity. Electromechanical switches, relays, and contactors “turn power on” when the moving electrode makes contact with the stationary electrode to carry current. Conversely, they “turn power off” when the moving electrode breaks contact and the resulting arc plasma stops burning as the dielectric gap widens sufficiently to prevent current flow. Power relays and contactors have two primary life expectancy ratings: “mechanical life” is based on operating either without current or below the wetting current (i.e., “Dry”) and “electrical life” is based on operating above the wetting current (i.e., “Wet”). These different ratings are due to contacts being designed to compensate for the destructive arcing that naturally occurs between the electrodes during normal Wet operation. Contact arcing is so destructive that the electrical life of power relays and contactors is most often a fraction of their respective mechanical life.

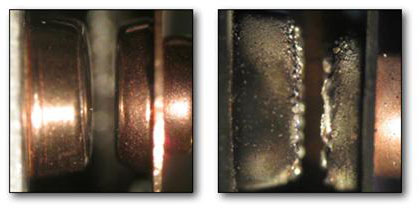
From left to right: 1. Pristine contacts from a relay; 2. The nearly destroyed contacts from a relay operated under power for nearly 100,000 cycles

Every time the contacts of an electromechanical switch, relay or contactor are opened or closed, there is a certain amount of contact wear. If the contact is cycling without electricity (dry), the impact of the contact electrodes a slightly deformed by the resulting cold forging. When the contact is operating under power (wet), the sources of the wear are the result of high current densities in microscopic areas, and the electric arc. Contact wear includes material transfer between contacts, loss of contact material due to splattering and evaporation, and oxidation or corrosion of the contacts due to high temperatures and atmospheric influences.

While a pair of contacts is closed, only a small part of the contacts are in intimate contact due to asperities and low-conductivity films. Because of the constriction of the current to a very small area, the current density frequently becomes so high that it melts a microscopic portion of the contact. During the close-to-open (BREAK) transition, a microscopic molten bridge forms and eventually ruptures asymmetrically, transferring contact material between contacts and increasing the surface roughness. This can also occur during the open-to-close (MAKE) transition due to contact bounce.

The electric arc occurs between the contact points (electrodes) both during the transition from closed to open (BREAK) and from open to closed (make) when the contact gap is small and the voltage is high enough. Heating due to arcing and high current density can melt the contact surface temporarily. If some of the melting material solidifies while the contacts are closed, the contact may stick closed due to a micro-weld, similar to spot welding.

The arc caused during the contact BREAK (BREAK arc) is similar to arc welding, as the BREAK arc is typically more energetic and more destructive. The arc can cause material transfer between contacts. The arc may also be hot enough to evaporate metal from the contact surface.

The high temperatures can also cause the contact metals to more rapidly oxidize and corrode.

Contacts reach end of life for one of two reasons. Either the contacts fail to BREAK because they are stuck (welded) closed, or the contacts fail to make (high resistance) because of contact corrosion or because excessive material is lost from one or both contacts. These conditions are the result of cumulative material transfer during successive switching operations, and of material loss due to evaporation and splattering.

There are additional mechanisms for stuck closed failures, such as mechanical interlocking of rough contact surfaces due to contact wear.

== Protection ==
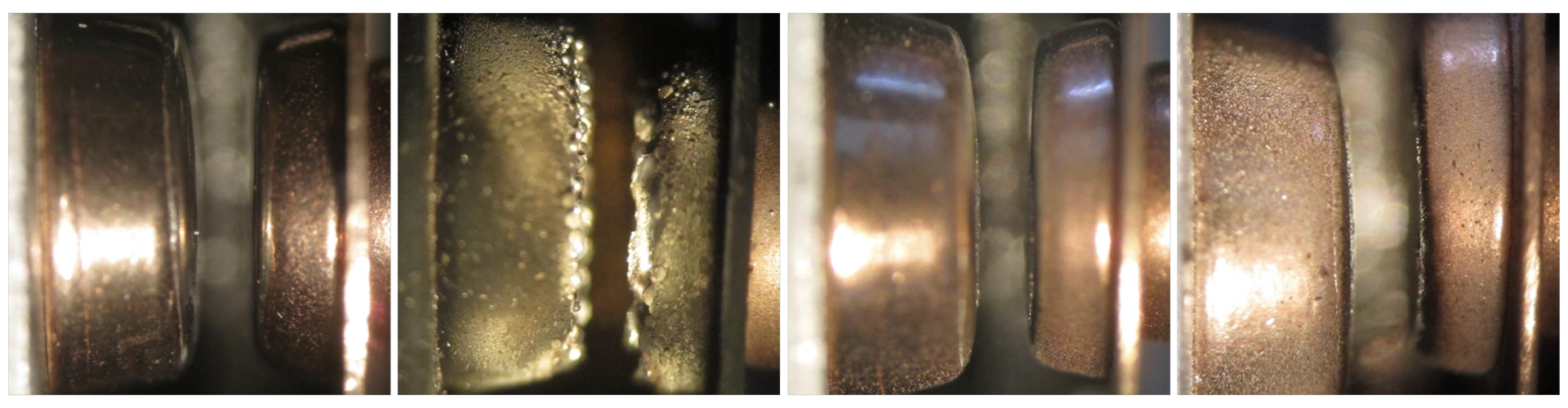
Contact Protection Using Electronic Power Contact Arc Suppression - from left to right: new contact (out of box); failed contact with < 100K unprotected cycles; "like new" contact after 100K protected cycles; and "like new" contact after 1 million protected cycles.

The degradation of the contacts can be limited by including various contact protection methods.

Below 2 Amperes, a variety of transient suppressing electronic components have been employed with varying success as arc suppressors, including: capacitors, snubbers, diodes, Zener diodes, transient voltage suppressors (TVS), resistors, varistors or in-rush current limiters (PTC and NTC resistors). However, this is the least effective method as these neither significantly influence the creation of nor suppress the arc between the contacts of electromechanical power switches, relays and contactors.

Historically, the two most common approaches to contact protection (above 2 Amperes) have been making the contacts themselves larger, i.e., a contactor and/or making the contacts out of more durable metals or metal alloys such as tungsten.

The most effective methods are to employ arc suppression circuitry including electronic power contact arc suppressors, solid state relays, hybrid power relays, mercury displacement relays and hybrid power contactors.

== See also ==
- Arc suppression
- Contact resistance
- Wetting current
- Wetting voltage
