= Exploding wire method =

Plasma and materials physics experimental setup

The exploding wire method or EWM is a way to generate plasma that consists of sending a strong enough pulse of electric current through a thin wire of some electrically conductive material. The resistive heating vaporizes the wire, and an electric arc through that vapor creates an explosive shockwave.

Exploding wires are used as detonators for explosives, as momentary high intensity light sources, and in the production of metal nanoparticles.

== History ==
One of the first documented cases of using electricity to melt a metal occurred in the late 1700s and is credited to Martin van Marum who melted 70 feet of metal wire with 64 Leyden Jars as a capacitor. Van Marum's generator was built in 1784, and is now located in the Teylers Museum in the Netherlands. Years later, Benjamin Franklin vaporized thin gold leaf to burn images onto paper. While neither Marum nor Franklin actually incited the exploding wire phenomenon, they were both important steps towards its discovery.

Edward Nairne was the first to note the existence of the exploding wire method in 1774 with silver and copper wire. Subsequently, Michael Faraday used EWM to deposit thin gold films through the solidification of vaporized metal on adjacent surfaces. Then, vapor deposits of metal gas as a result of EWM were studied by August Toepler during the 1800s. Spectrography investigation of the process, led by J.A. Anderson, became widespread in the 1900s. The spectrography experiments enabled a better understanding and subsequently the first glimpses of practical application. The mid 20th century saw experiments with EWM as a light source and for the production of nanoparticles in aluminum, uranium and plutonium wires. Congruently, Luis Álvarez and Lawrence H. Johnston of the Manhattan Project found use for EWM in the development of nuclear detonators.

Current day research focuses on utilizing EWM to produce nanoparticles as well as better understanding specifics of the mechanism such as the effects of the system environment on the process.

== Mechanism ==
The basic components needed for the exploding wire method are a thin conductive wire and a capacitor. The wire is typically gold, aluminum, iron or platinum, and is usually less than 0.5 mm in diameter. The capacitor has an energy consumption of about 25 kWh/kg and discharges a pulse of current density 10^{4} - 10^{6} A/mm^{2}, leading to temperatures up to 100,000 K. The phenomenon occurs over a time period of only 10^{−8} - 10^{−5} seconds.

The process is as follows:

1. A rising current, supplied by the capacitor, is carried across the wire.
2. The current heats up the wire through ohmic heating until the metal begins to melt. The metal melts to form a broken series of imperfect spheres called unduloids. The current rises so fast that the liquid metal has no time to move out of the way.
3. The unduloids vaporize. The metal vapor creates a lower resistance path, allowing an even higher current to flow.
4. An electric arc is formed, which turns the vapor into plasma. A bright flash of light is also produced.
5. The plasma is allowed to expand freely, creating a shock wave.
6. Electromagnetic radiation is released in tandem with the shock wave.
7. The shock wave pushes liquid, gaseous and plasmatic metal outwards, breaking the circuit and ending the process.

== Practical Application ==
EWM research has suggested possible applications in the excitation of optical masers, high intensity light sources for communications, spacecraft propulsion, joining difficult materials such as quartz, and generation of high power radio-frequency pulses. The most promising applications of EWM are as a detonator, light source, and for the production of nanoparticles.

=== Detonator ===
EWM has found its most common use as a detonator, named the exploding-bridgewire detonator, for nuclear bombs. Bridgewire detonators are advantageous over chemical fuses as the explosion is consistent and occurs only a few microseconds after the current is applied, with variation of only a few tens of nanoseconds from detonator to detonator.

=== Light Source ===
EWM is an effective mechanism by which to get a short duration high intensity light source. The peak intensity for copper wire, for example, is 9.6·10^{8} candle power/cm^{2}. J.A. Anderson wrote in his initial spectrography studies that the light was comparable to a black body at 20,000 K. The advantage of a flash produced in this way is that it is easily reproducible with little variation in intensity. The linear nature of the wire allows for specifically shaped and angled light flashes and different types of wires can be used to produce different colors of light. The light source can be used in interferometry, flash photolysis, quantitative spectroscopy, and high-speed photography.

=== Production of Nanoparticles ===
Nanoparticles are created by EWM when the ambient gas of the system cools the recently produced vaporous metal. EWM can be used to cheaply and efficiently produce nanoparticles at a rate of 50 – 300 grams per hour and at a purity of above 99%. The process requires a relatively low energy consumption as little energy is lost in an electric to thermal energy conversion. Environmental effects are minimal due to the process taking place in a closed system. The Particles can be as small as 10 nm but are most commonly below 100 nm in diameter. Physical attributes of the nanopowder can be altered depending on the parameters of the explosion. For example, as the voltage of the capacitor is raised, the particle diameter decreases. Also, the pressure of the gas environment can change the dispersiveness of the nanoparticles. Through such manipulations the functionality of the nanopowder may be altered.

When EWM is performed in a standard atmosphere containing oxygen, metal oxides are formed. Pure metal nanoparticles can also be produced with EWM in an inert environment, usually argon gas or distilled water. Pure metal nanopowders must be kept in their inert environment because they ignite when exposed to oxygen in air. Often, the metal vapor is contained by operating the mechanism within a steel box or similar container.

Nanoparticles are a relatively new material used in medicine, manufacturing, environmental cleanup and circuitry. Metal oxide and pure metal nanoparticles are used in Catalysis, sensors, oxygen antioxidant, self repairing metal, ceramics, UV ray protection, odor proofing, improved batteries, printable circuits, optoelectronic materials, and Environmental remediation. The demand for metal nanoparticles, and therefore production methods, has increased as interest in nanotechnology continues to rise. Despite its overwhelming simplicity and efficiency, it is difficult to modify the experimental apparatus to be used on an industrial scale. As such, EWM has not seen widespread utilization in material production industry due to issues in manufacturing quantity. Still, for some time, Argonide offered metal nanopowders made by the exploding wire method that were manufactured in Russia.
