= Exploding-bridgewire detonator =

Detonator fired by electric current

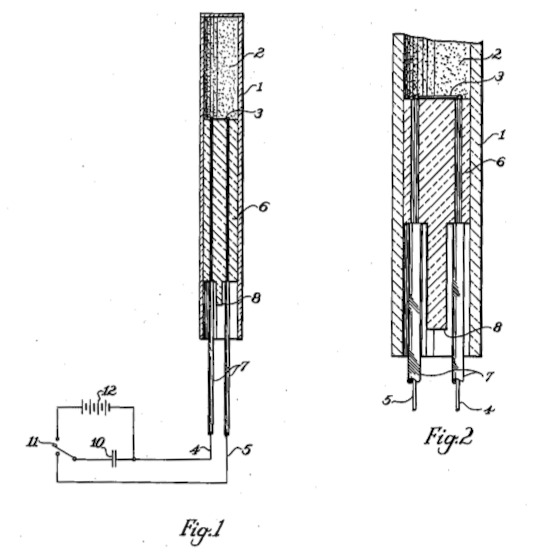
Image from the exploding-bridgewire detonator patent. Fig. 2 is a detail of Fig. 1.: 1. Housing; 2. High explosive; 3. Fuse wire; 4. Lead-in wire; 5. Lead-in wire; 6. Insulating support; 7. Cambrick tubing; 8. Dividing portion of the support; 9. (Nothing labeled); 10. Condenser (capacitor); 11. Switch; 12. Battery

The exploding-bridgewire detonator (EBW, also known as exploding wire detonator) is a type of detonator used to initiate the detonation reaction in explosive materials, similar to a blasting cap because it is fired using an electric current. EBWs use a different physical mechanism than blasting caps, using more electricity delivered much more rapidly. They explode with more precise timing after the electric current is applied by the process of exploding wire. The precise timing of exploding wire detonators compared with other types of detonators has led to their common use in nuclear weapons.

The slapper detonator is a more recent development along similar lines.

== History ==
The EBW was invented by Luis Alvarez and Lawrence Johnston for the Fat Man–type bombs of the Manhattan Project, during their work in Los Alamos National Laboratory. The Fat Man Model 1773 EBW detonators used an unusual, high reliability detonator system with two EBW "horns" attached to a single booster charge, which then fired each of the 32 explosive lens units.

== Description ==
EBWs were developed as a means of detonating multiple explosive charges simultaneously, mainly for use in plutonium-based nuclear weapons in which a plutonium core (called a pit) is compressed very rapidly. This is achieved via conventional explosives placed uniformly around the pit. The implosion must be highly symmetrical or the plutonium would simply be ejected at the low-pressure points. Consequently, the detonators must have very precise timing.

An EBW has two main parts: a piece of fine wire which contacts the explosive, and a high-voltage high-current low-impedance electricity source; it must reliably and consistently supply a rapid starting pulse. When the wire is connected across this voltage, the resulting high current melts and then vaporizes the wire in a few microseconds. The resulting shock and heat initiate the high explosive.

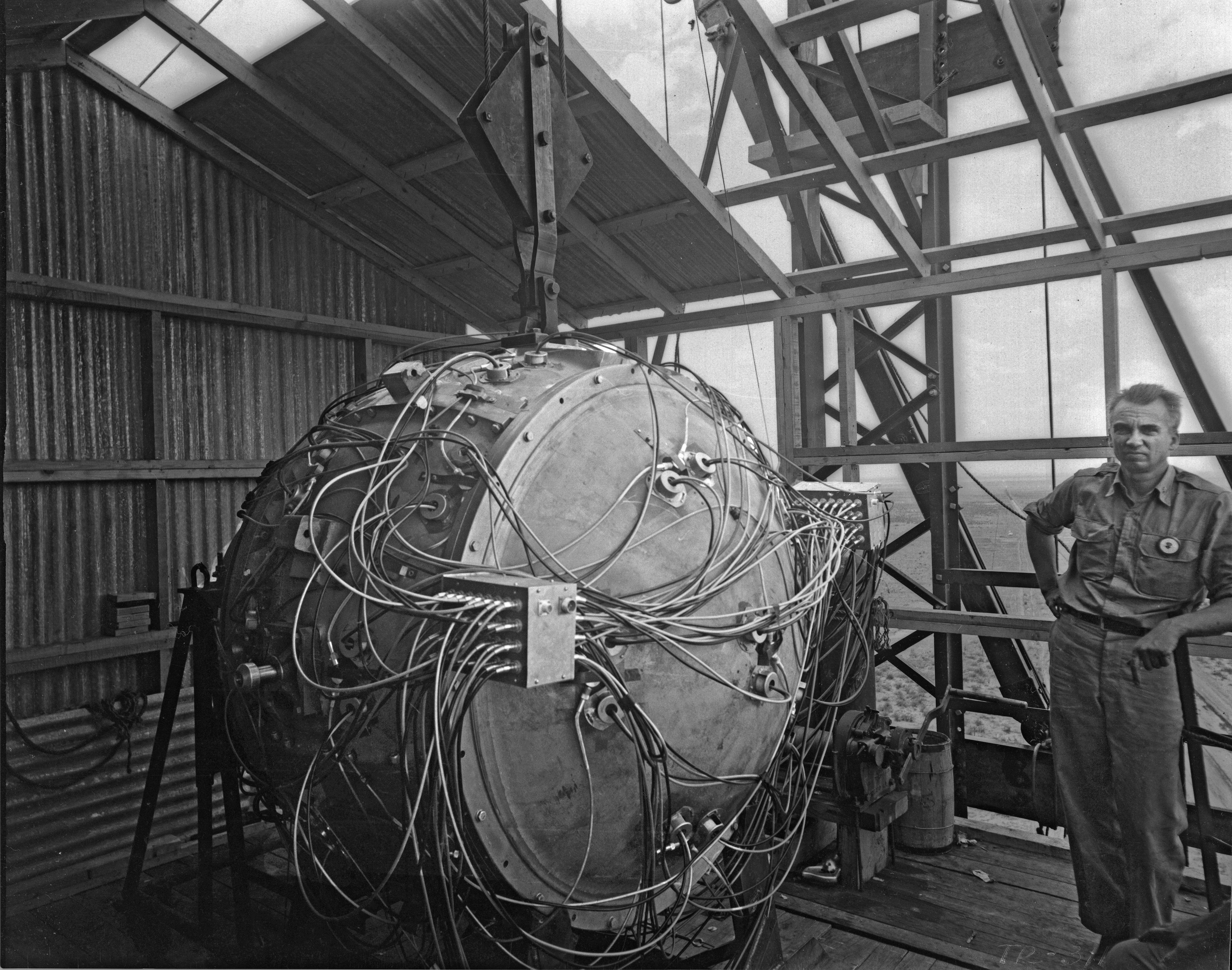
Trinity Gadget

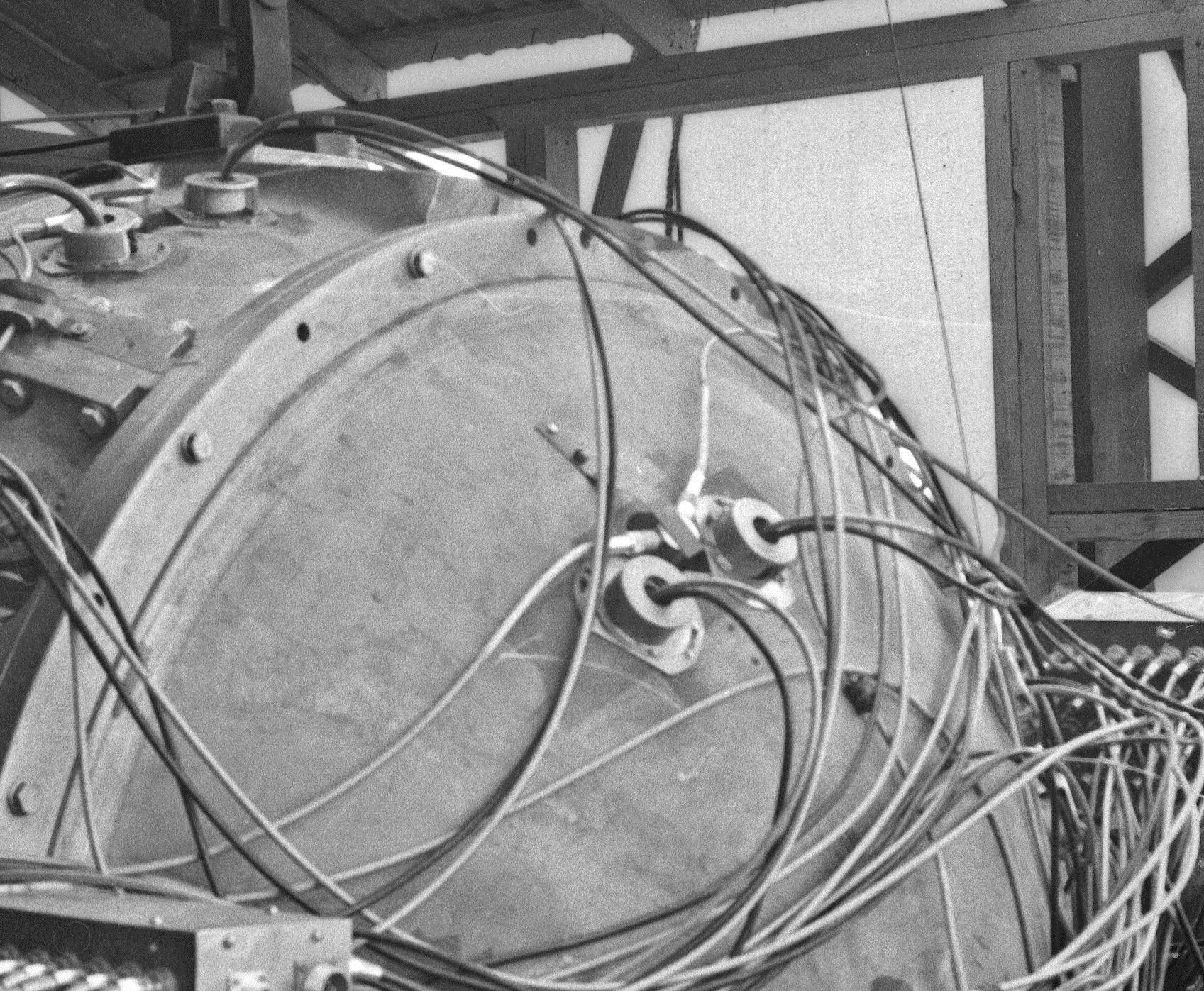
Closeup of a detonator set. The EBW is the Y-shaped device with two wires coming in at angles along the surface. The larger round objects with two wires coming out perpendicular to the surface are diagnostic equipment.

This accounts for the heavy cables seen in photos of the Trinity "Gadget"; high voltage cable requires good insulation and they had to deliver a large current with little voltage drop, lest the EBW not achieve the phase transition quickly enough.

The precise timing of EBWs is achieved by the detonator using direct physical effects of the vaporized bridgewire to initiate detonation in the detonator's booster charge. Given a sufficiently high and well-controlled amount of electric current and voltage, the timing of the bridgewire vaporization is both extremely short (a few microseconds) and extremely precise and predictable (standard deviation of time to detonate as low as a few tens of nanoseconds).

Conventional blasting caps use electricity to heat a bridge wire rather than vaporize it, and that heating then causes the primary explosive to detonate. Imprecise contact between the bridgewire and the primary explosive changes how quickly the explosive is heated up, and minor electrical variations in the wire or leads will change how quickly it heats up as well. The heating process typically takes milliseconds to tens of milliseconds to complete and initiate detonation in the primary explosive. This is roughly 1,000 to 10,000 times longer and less precise than the EBW electrical vaporization.

Modern exploding-bridgewire detonators arranged in a tray.

=== Use in nuclear weapons ===
High explosives such as RDX and Primacord have a detonation velocity of 8 millimeters per microsecond. A one microsecond delay in detonation from one side of a nuclear weapon to the other would mean a travel distance of four millimeters. The Fat Man development eventually brought the timing spread for hundreds of detonations down to a few billionths of a second.

In the US, due to their use in nuclear weapons, these devices are subject to nuclear control authorities, according to the Guidelines for the Export of Nuclear Material, Equipment and Technology. EBWs are on the United States Munitions List, and exports are highly regulated.

=== Civilian use ===
EBWs have found uses outside nuclear weapons, such as the Titan IV missile, safety conscious applications where stray electrical currents might detonate normal blasting caps, and applications requiring very precise timing for multiple point commercial blasting in mines or quarries. EBW detonators are much safer than regular electric detonators because, unlike regular detonators, EBWs do not have primary explosives. Primary explosives such as lead azide are very sensitive to static electricity, radio frequency, shock, etc.

== Mechanism of operation ==
The bridgewire is usually made of gold, but platinum or gold/platinum alloys can also be used. The most common commercial wire size is 0.038 mm (1.5 mils) in diameter and 1 mm (40 mils) in length, but lengths ranging from 0.25 mm to 2.5 mm (10 mils to 100 mils) can be encountered. From the available explosives, only PETN at low densities can be initiated by sufficiently low shock to make its use practical in commercial systems as a part of the EBW initiator. It can be chained with another explosive booster, often a pellet of tetryl, RDX or some PBX (e.g., PBX 9407). Detonators without such booster are called initial pressing detonators (IP detonators).

During initiation, the wire heats with the passing current until melting point is reached. The heating rate is high enough that the liquid metal has no time to flow away, and heats further until it vaporizes. During this phase the electrical resistance of the bridgewire assembly rises. Then an electric arc forms in the metal vapor, leading to drop of electrical resistance and sharp growth of the current, quick further heating of the ionized metal vapor, and formation of a shock wave. To achieve the melting and subsequent vaporizing of the wire in time sufficiently short to create a shock wave, a current rise rate of at least 100 amperes per microsecond is required.

If the current rise rate is lower, the bridge may burn, perhaps causing deflagration of the PETN pellet, but it will not cause detonation. PETN-containing EBWs are also relatively insensitive to a static electricity discharge. Their use is limited by the thermal stability range of PETN. Slapper detonators, which can use high density hexanitrostilbene, may used in temperatures up to almost 300 °C (572 °F) in environments ranging from vacuum to high pressures.

== Firing system ==
The EBW and the slapper detonator are the safest known types of detonators, as only a very high-current fast-rise pulse can successfully trigger them. However, they require a bulky power source for the current surges required. The extremely short rise times are usually achieved by discharging a low-inductance, high-capacitance, high-voltage capacitor (e.g., oil-filled, Mylar-foil, or ceramic) through a suitable switch (spark gap, thyratron, krytron, etc.) into the bridge wire. A very rough approximation for the capacitor is a rating of 5 kilovolts and 1 microfarad, and the peak current ranges between 500 and 1000 amperes. The high voltage may be generated using a Marx generator. Low-impedance capacitors and low-impedance coaxial cables are required to achieve the necessary current rise rate.

The flux compression generator is one alternative to capacitors. When fired, it creates a strong electromagnetic pulse, which is inductively coupled into one or more secondary coils connected to the bridge wires or slapper foils. A low energy density capacitor equivalent to a compression generator would be roughly the size of a soda can. The energy in such a capacitor would be 1/2·C·V^{2}, which for the above-mentioned capacitor is 12.5 J. (By comparison, a defibrillator delivers ~200 J from 2 kV and perhaps 20 μF. The flash-strobe in a disposable camera is typically 3 J from a 300 V capacitor of 100 μF.)

In a fission bomb, the same or similar circuit is used for powering the neutron generator, the initial source of fission neutrons.

== See also ==
- Nuclear weapon design – Implosion-type weapon
- Triggering sequence
- Slapper detonator (A further development of the exploding-bridgewire detonator)
- Electrothermal-chemical technology
