= Slapper detonator =

Type of electrically fired detonator

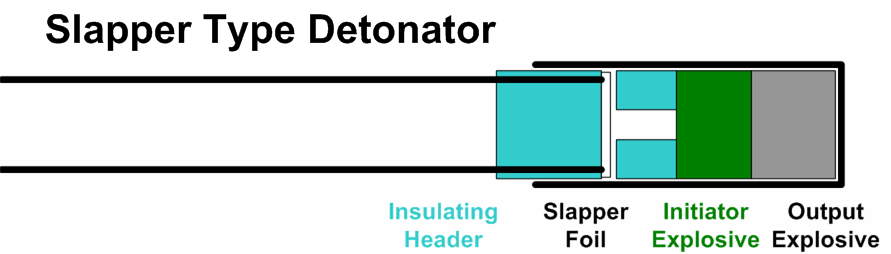
Diagram of a slapper detonator

A slapper detonator, also called exploding foil initiator (EFI), is a detonator developed by Lawrence Livermore National Laboratory, US Patent No. 4,788,913 (Filed 1971, Granted 1988). It is an improvement over the earlier exploding-bridgewire detonator. Instead of directly coupling the shock wave from the exploding wire (as the bridgewire does), the expanding plasma from an explosion of a metal foil drives another thin plastic or metal foil called a "flyer" or a "slapper" across a gap, and its high-velocity impact on an explosive (for example, PETN or hexanitrostilbene) then delivers the energy and shock needed to initiate a detonation. Normally all the slapper's kinetic energy is supplied by the heating (and hence expansion) of the plasma (the former foil) by the current passing through it, though constructions with a "back strap" to further drive the plasma forward by magnetic field also exist. This assembly is quite efficient; up to 30% of the electrical energy can be converted to the slapper's kinetic energy. The device's name is derived from the English word "slap".

The initial explosion is usually caused by explosive vaporization of a thin metal wire or strip, by driving several thousand amperes of electric current through it, usually from a capacitor charged to several thousand volts. The switching may be done by a spark gap or a krytron.

Usually the construction consists of an explosive booster pellet, against which a disk with a hole in the center is set. Over the other side of the disk, there is a layer of an insulating film, for example, Kapton or PET film, with a thin strip of metal (typically aluminum or gold) foil deposited on its outer side. A narrowed section of the metal then explosively vaporizes when a current pulse passes through it, which shears the mylar foil and the plasma ball pushes it through the hole, accelerating it to very high speed. The impact then detonates the explosive pellet.

Slapper detonators are frequently used in modern weapon designs and aerospace technology.

== Advantages ==
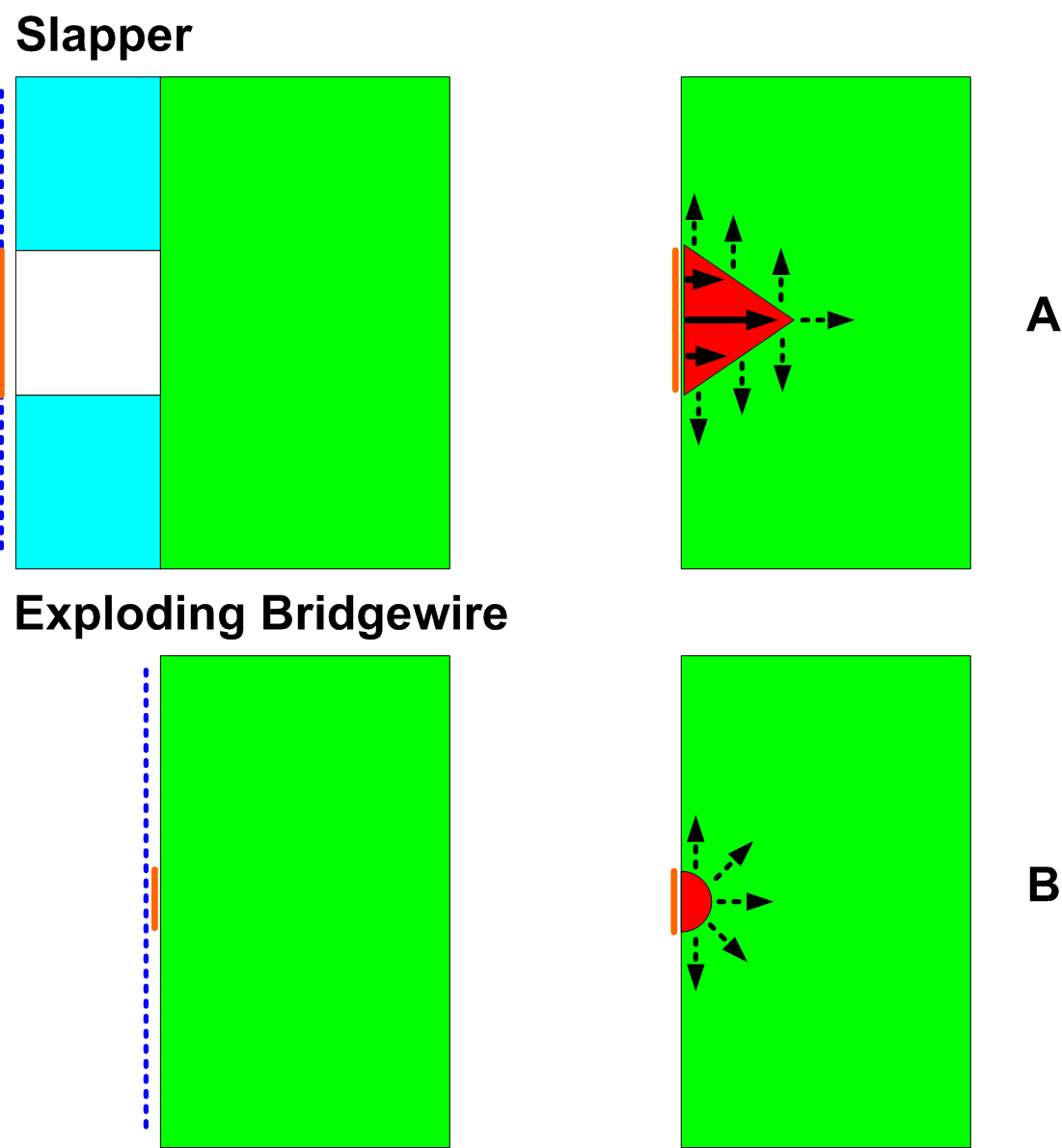
Diagram of slapper and EBW detonators initiating detonation. (A) Slapper detonator's pellet or flyer impacts a wider area of surface on the explosive output charge, and even though energy is lost to the sides of the area impacted, a cone of explosive is efficiently compressed. (B) EBW detonators only initiate a single point, and energy is lost in all directions, making the energy transfer less efficient.

Advantages over explosive-bridgewire detonators include:

- The foil does not come in contact with the explosive, which reduces the risk of corrosion of the foil or chemical reactions between the foil and explosive producing unstable compounds, and secondarily further reduces the risk of accidental electrical ignition of the explosive.
- The energy to fire the detonator is quite low
- The slapper pellet impacting an area of explosives rather than a single point as in an EBW is more reliable and efficient at initiating detonation.
- The explosive can be pressed to higher density
- Very insensitive explosives can be initiated directly.

In a variant called laser detonator the vaporization can be caused by a high-power laser pulse delivered over-the-air or coupled by an optical fiber; this is reportedly used as a safety detonator in some mining operations and quarries. Typically a 1-watt solid-state laser is used.

== See also ==
- Nuclear weapon design
- Triggering sequence
- Exploding-bridgewire detonator
- Electrothermal-chemical technology
- Firing system for exploding-bridgewire detonator
