= Argonide =

Argonide Corporation is a Florida nanotechnology company. The company was formed in 1994 by American Fred Tepper, partly to provide employment for former Russian (government) scientists. Argonide began offering nanometal powders made by the exploding wire method (EWM) in 1997.

Their main product, NanoCeram, uses aluminum oxide nanofibers for water filtration. The filter uses nanofibers originally developed at the Design Technology Center (DTC) in Tomsk, Russia. NanoCeram can be incorporated into glass and cellulose non-woven sheets, is an extremely effective filtration medium. The aluminum oxide fibers, which are only 2 nanometers wide, attract dirt, bacteria, viruses, and proteins using an electrostatic effect. NanoCeram can match the particle removal effectiveness of ultrafiltration, and it allows orders-of-magnitude higher flow rates at a given pressure difference or pressure drop.

Argonide has been awarded a NASA Small Business Innovation Research (SBIR) contract to filter water aboard the Space Shuttles. In 2002 it won an R&D 100 Award, given annually to the top 100 most technologically significant new products by R&D Magazine.
