= Electric arc =

Electrical breakdown of a gas that results in an ongoing electrical discharge

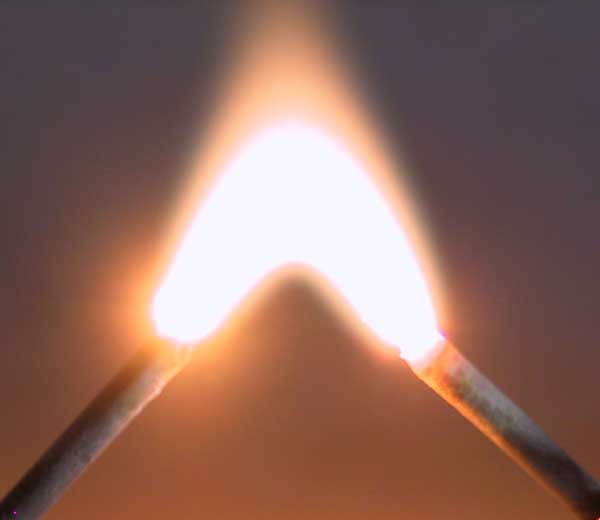
An electric arc between two nails

An electric arc (or arc discharge) is an electrical breakdown of a gas that produces a prolonged electrical discharge. The current through a normally nonconductive medium such as air produces a plasma, which may produce visible light. An arc discharge is initiated either by thermionic emission or by field emission. After initiation, the arc relies on thermionic emission of electrons from the electrodes supporting the arc. An arc discharge is characterized by a lower voltage than a glow discharge. An archaic term is voltaic arc, as used in the phrase "voltaic arc lamp".

Techniques for arc suppression can be used to reduce the duration or likelihood of arc formation.

In the late 19th century, electric arc lighting was in wide use for public lighting. Some low-pressure electric arcs are used in many applications. For example, fluorescent tubes, mercury, sodium, and metal-halide lamps are used for lighting; xenon arc lamps have been used for movie projectors. Electric arcs can be utilized for manufacturing processes, such as electric arc welding, plasma cutting and electric arc furnaces for steel recycling.

== History ==
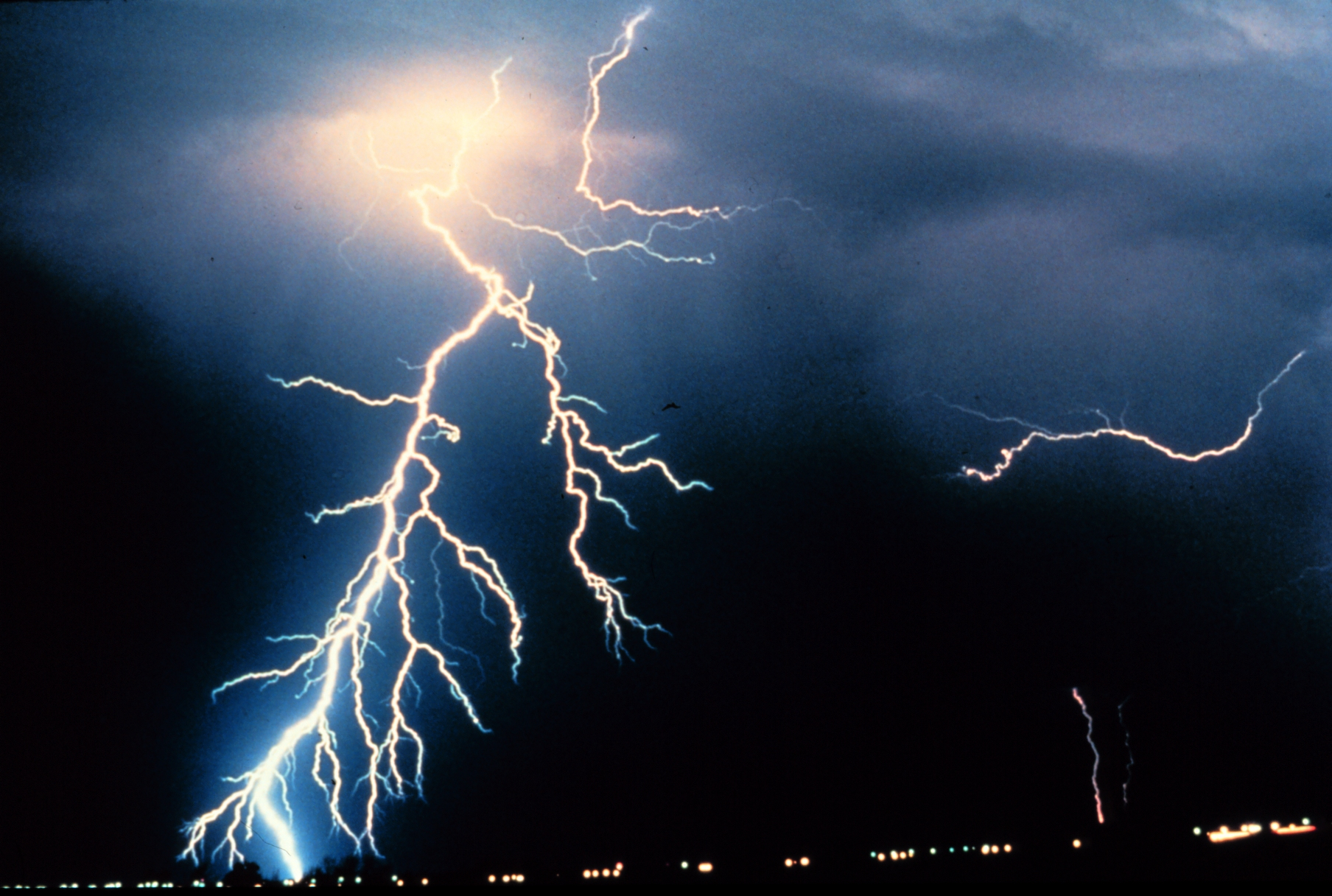
Natural lightning is an electric spark because it is a brief pulse, not an arc (which is continuous)

Sir Humphry Davy discovered the short-pulse electrical arc in 1800. In 1801, he described the phenomenon in a paper published in William Nicholson's Journal of Natural Philosophy, Chemistry and the Arts. According to modern science, Davy's description was a spark rather than an arc. In the same year Davy publicly demonstrated the effect, before the Royal Society, by transmitting an electric current through two carbon rods that touched, and then pulling them a short distance apart. The demonstration produced a "feeble" arc, not readily distinguished from a sustained spark, between charcoal points. The Society subscribed for a more powerful battery of 1,000 plates, and in 1808 he demonstrated the large-scale arc. He is credited with naming the arc. He called it an arc because it assumes the shape of an upward bow when the distance between the electrodes is not small. This is due to the buoyant force on the hot gas.

The first continuous arc was discovered independently in 1802 and described in 1803 as a "special fluid with electrical properties", by Vasily V. Petrov, a Russian scientist experimenting with a copper-zinc battery consisting of 4200 discs.

In the late nineteenth century, electric arc lighting was in wide use for public lighting. The tendency of electric arcs to flicker and hiss was a major problem. In 1895, Hertha Marks Ayrton wrote a series of articles for the Electrician, explaining that these phenomena were the result of oxygen coming into contact with the carbon rods used to create the arc. In 1899, she was the first woman ever to read her own paper before the Institution of Electrical Engineers (IEE). Her paper was entitled "The Hissing of the Electric Arc". Shortly thereafter, Ayrton was elected the first female member of the IEE; the next woman to be admitted to the IEE was in 1958. She petitioned to present a paper before the Royal Society, but she was not allowed because of her gender, and "The Mechanism of the Electric Arc" was read by John Perry in her stead in 1901.

== Overview ==
Electric arcs between the power line and pantographs of an electric train after catenary icing

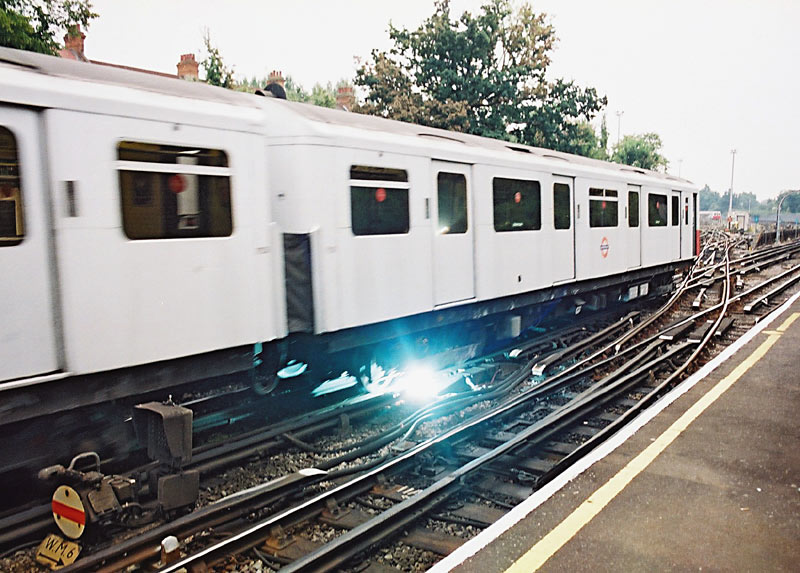
Electricity arcs between the power rail and electrical pickup "shoe" on a London Underground train

An electric arc is the form of electric discharge with the highest current density. The maximum current through an arc is limited only by the external circuit, not by the arc itself.

An arc between two electrodes can be initiated by ionization and glow discharge, when the current through the electrodes is increased. The breakdown voltage of the electrode gap is a combined function of the pressure, distance between electrodes and type of gas surrounding the electrodes. When an arc starts, its terminal voltage is much less than a glow discharge, and current is higher. An arc in gases near atmospheric pressure is characterized by visible light emission, high current density, and high temperature. An arc is distinguished from a glow discharge partly by the similar temperatures of the electrons and the positive ions; in a glow discharge, the ions are much colder than the electrons.

A drawn arc can be initiated by two electrodes initially in contact and drawn apart; this can initiate an arc without the high-voltage glow discharge. This is the way a welder starts to weld a joint, momentarily touching the welding electrode against the workpiece, then withdrawing it until a stable arc is formed. Another example is separation of electrical contacts in switches, relays or circuit breakers; in high-energy circuits arc suppression may be required to prevent damage to contacts.

Electrical resistance along the continuous electric arc creates heat, which ionizes more gas molecules (where the degree of ionization is determined by temperature), and as per this sequence: solid-liquid-gas-plasma; the gas is gradually turned into a thermal plasma. A thermal plasma is in thermal equilibrium; the temperature is relatively homogeneous throughout the atoms, molecules, ions, and electrons. The energy given to electrons is dispersed rapidly to the heavier particles by elastic collisions, due to their great mobility and large numbers.

Current in the arc is sustained by thermionic emission and field emission of electrons at the cathode. The current may be concentrated in a very small hot spot on the cathode; current densities on the order of one million amperes per square centimeter can be found. Unlike a glow discharge, an arc has little discernible structure, since the positive column is quite bright and extends nearly to the electrodes on both ends. The cathode fall and anode fall of a few volts occur within a fraction of a millimeter of each electrode. The positive column has a lower voltage gradient and may be absent in very short arcs.

A low-frequency (less than 100 Hz) alternating current arc resembles a direct current arc; on each cycle, the arc is initiated by breakdown, and the electrodes interchange roles, as anode or cathode, when current reverses. As the frequency of the current increases, there is not enough time for all ionization to disperse on each half cycle, and the breakdown is no longer needed to sustain the arc; the voltage vs. current characteristic becomes more nearly ohmic.

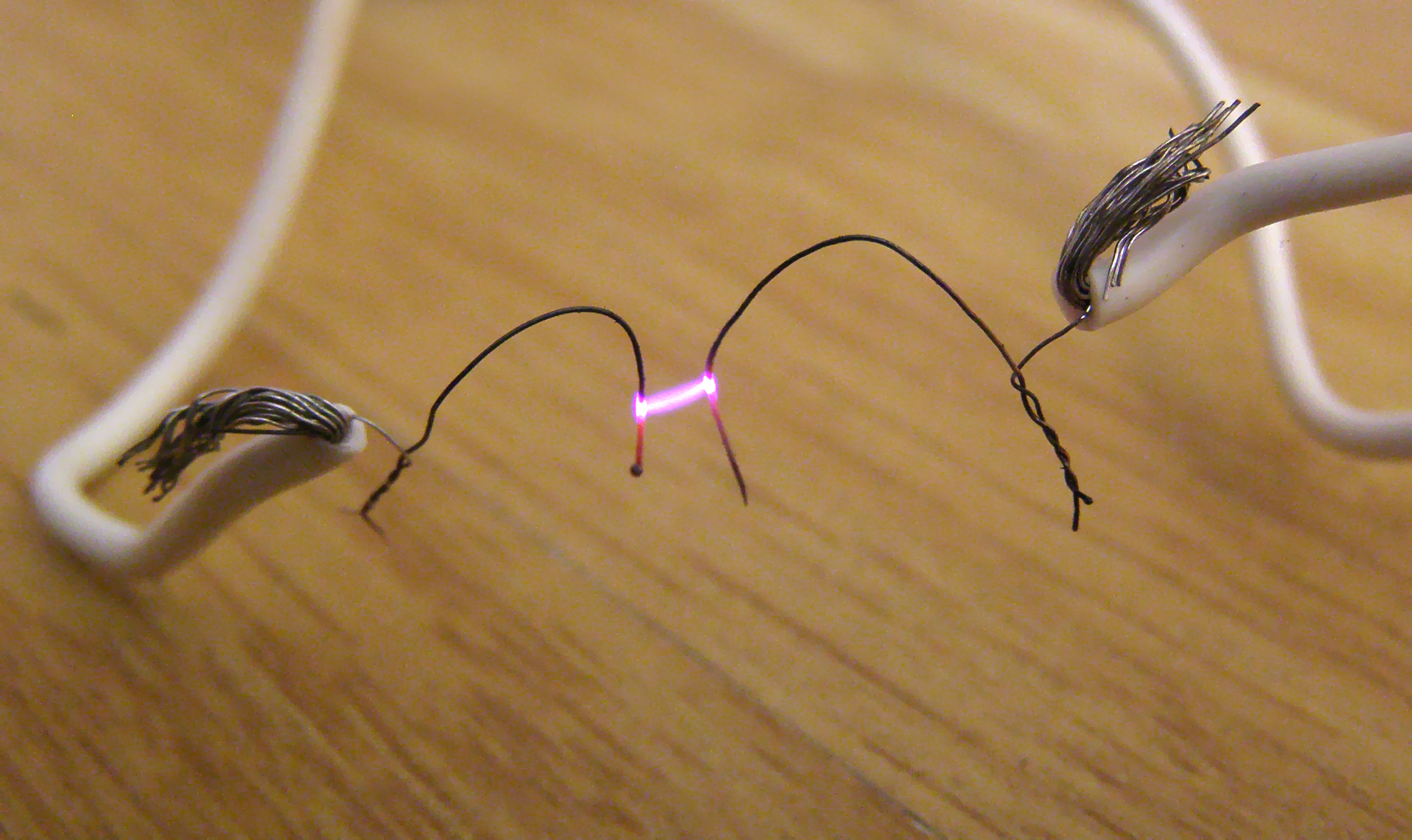
Electric arc between strands of wire.

The various shapes of electric arcs are emergent properties of non-linear patterns of current and electric field. The arc occurs in the gas-filled space between two conductive electrodes (often made of tungsten or carbon) and it results in a very high temperature, capable of melting or vaporizing most materials. An electric arc is a continuous discharge, while the similar electric spark discharge is momentary. An electric arc may occur either in direct current (DC) circuits or in alternating current (AC) circuits. In the latter case, the arc may re-strike on each half cycle of the current. An electric arc differs from a glow discharge in that the current density is quite high, and the voltage drop within the arc is low; at the cathode, the current density can be as high as one megaampere per square centimeter.

An electric arc has a non-linear relationship between current and voltage. Once the arc is established (either by progression from a glow discharge or by momentarily touching the electrodes then separating them), increased current results in a lower voltage between the arc terminals. This negative resistance effect requires that some positive form of impedance (as an electrical ballast) be placed in the circuit to maintain a stable arc. This property is the reason uncontrolled electrical arcs in apparatus become so destructive, since once initiated an arc will draw more and more current from a fixed-voltage supply until the apparatus is destroyed.

There exists a form of moving electric arc known as a gliding arc discharge, initiated at the shortest gap between diverging electrodes placed in a fast gas flow (typically over 10 m/s). The discharge moves ("glides") progressively along the electrodes in the direction of gas flow until it breaks and extinguishes. This continual movement of the arc roots prevents electrode erosion and allows direct and efficient transfer of electrical energy into the flowing gas. Initially, the plasma formed is close to thermodynamic equilibrium but as the arc elongates, it rapidly transitions into a non-equilibrium, nonthermal plasma characterized by significant temperature differences between electrons and gas molecules.

== Uses ==
An electric arc can melt calcium oxide

Industrially, electric arcs are used for welding, plasma cutting, for electrical discharge machining, as an arc lamp in movie projectors, and spotlights in stage lighting. Electric arc furnaces are used to produce steel and other substances. Depending on the electrical properties of the medium the arc travels through, in air, an arc can generate temperatures ranging from 3500K to 19,600K, emitting white to blue light (as well as ultraviolet and x-ray radiation) and producing intense acoustical energy as air becomes ionized. Calcium carbide is made in this way as it requires a large amount of energy to promote an endothermic reaction (at temperatures of 2500 °C).

Carbon arc lights were the first electric lights. They were used for street lights in the 19th century and for specialized applications such as searchlights until World War II. Today, electric arcs are used in many applications. For example, fluorescent tubes, mercury, sodium, and metal halide lamps are used for lighting; xenon arc lamps are used for movie projectors and theatrical spotlights.

Formation of an intense electric arc, similar to a small-scale arc flash, is the foundation of exploding-bridgewire detonators.

Electric arcs are used in arcjet, a form of electric propulsion of spacecraft.

They are used in the laboratory for spectroscopy to create spectral emissions by intense heating of a sample of matter.

=== Protection of electrical equipment ===
Arcs are used in high voltage switchgear for protection of extra high voltage transmission networks. To protect a unit (e. g., a series capacitor in a transmission line) against overvoltage, an arc-inducing device, so called spark gap, is connected in parallel to the unit. Once the voltage reaches the air-breakdown threshold, an arc ignites across the spark plug and short-circuits the terminals of the unit, thus protecting the latter from the overvoltage. For the reinsertion of a unit, the arc needs to be extinguished, this can be achieved in multiple ways. For example, a spark gap can be fitted with arcing horns − two wires, approximately vertical but gradually diverging from each other towards the top in a narrow V shape. Once ignited, the arc will move upwards along the wires and will break down when the distance between the wires becomes too large. If the arc is extinguished and the original trigger condition no longer exists (a fault has been resolved or a bypass switch engaged), the arc will not reignite. The arc can be also broken by a blast of compressed air or another gas.

An undesirable arc can also occur when a high-voltage switch is opened and is extinguished in similar ways. Modern devices use sulphur hexafluoride at high pressure in a nozzle flow between separated electrodes within a pressurized vessel. The arc current is interrupted at the moment within an AC cycle when the current goes to zero and the highly electronegative SF_{6} ions quickly absorb free electrons from the decaying plasma. The SF_{6} technology mostly displaced the similar air-based one because many noisy air-blast units in series were required to prevent the arc inside the switch from re-igniting.

=== Visual entertainment ===
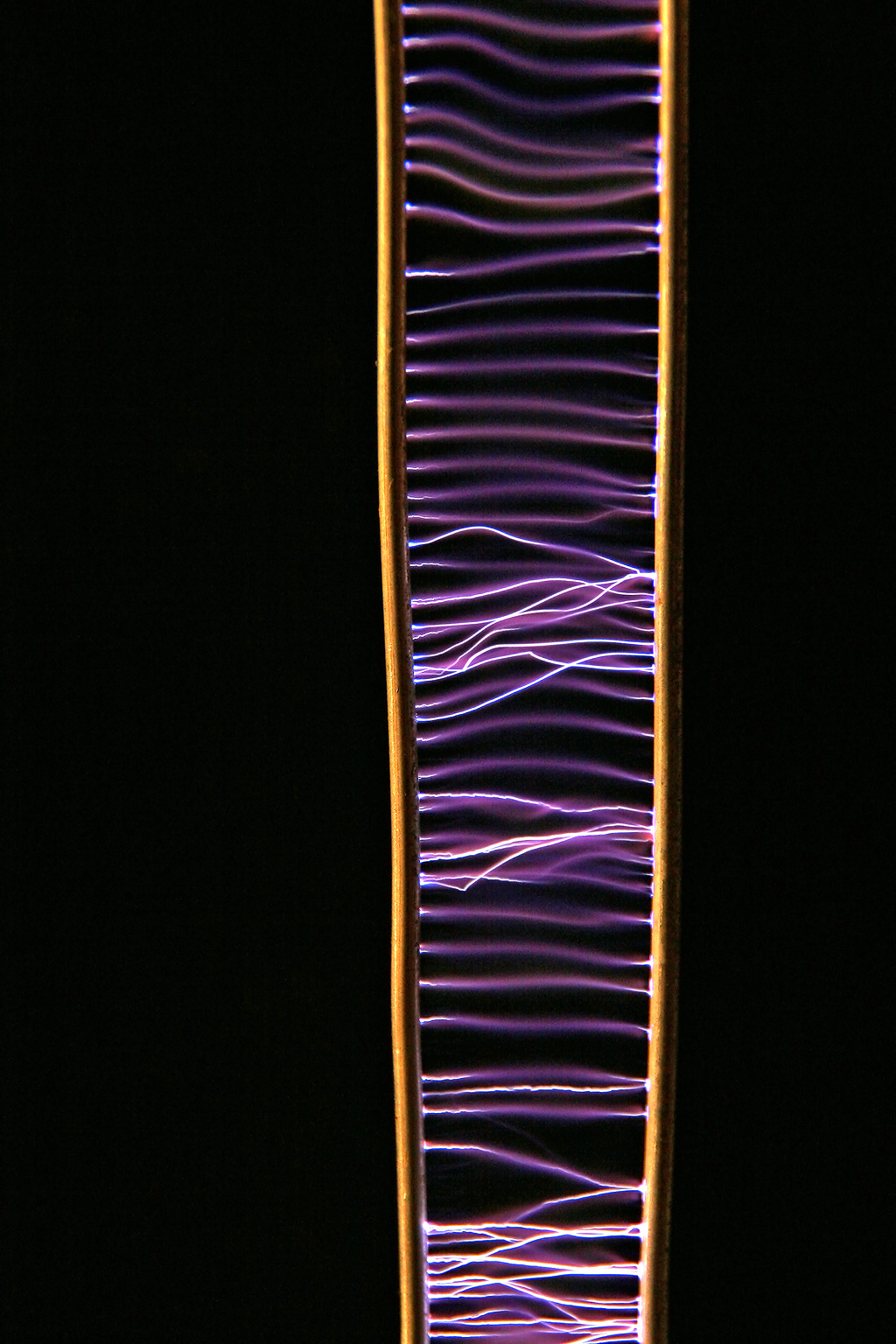
A time exposure of a Jacob's ladder

A demonstration of Jacob's ladder

Jacob's ladder at work

A Jacob's ladder (more formally, a high voltage travelling arc) is a device for producing a continuous train of electric arcs that rise upwards. The device is named for the Jacob's Ladder leading to heaven as described in the Bible. Similarly to the arcing horns, the spark gap is formed by two wires diverging from the base to the top.

When high voltage is applied to the gap, a spark forms across the bottom of the wires where they are nearest each other, rapidly changing to an electric arc. Air breaks down at about 30 kV/cm, depending on humidity, temperature, etc. Apart from the anode and cathode voltage drops, the arc behaves almost as a short circuit, drawing as much current as the electrical power supply can deliver, and the heavy load dramatically reduces the voltage across the gap.

The heated ionized air rises, carrying the current path with it. As the trail of ionization gets longer, it becomes more and more unstable, finally breaking. The voltage across the electrodes then rises and the spark re-forms at the bottom of the device.

This cycle leads to an exotic-looking display of electric white, yellow, blue or purple arcs, which is often seen in horror films and films about mad scientists. The device was a staple in schools and science fairs of the 1950s and 1960s, typically constructed out of a Model T spark coil or any other source of high voltage in the 10,000–30,000-volt range, such as a neon sign transformer (5–15 kV) or a television picture tube circuit (flyback transformer) (10–28 kV), and two coat hangers or rods built into a V shape. For larger ladders, microwave oven transformers connected in series, voltage multipliers and utility pole transformers (pole pigs) run in reverse (step-up) are commonly used.

Media related to Jacob's ladder at Wikimedia Commons

=== Guiding the arc ===
Scientists have discovered a method to control the path of an arc between two electrodes by firing laser beams at the gas between the electrodes. The gas becomes a plasma and guides the arc. By constructing the plasma path between the electrodes with different laser beams, the arc can be formed into curved and S-shaped paths. The arc could also hit an obstacle and reform on the other side of the obstacle. The laser-guided arc technology could be useful in applications to deliver a spark of electricity to a precise spot.

== Undesired arcing ==
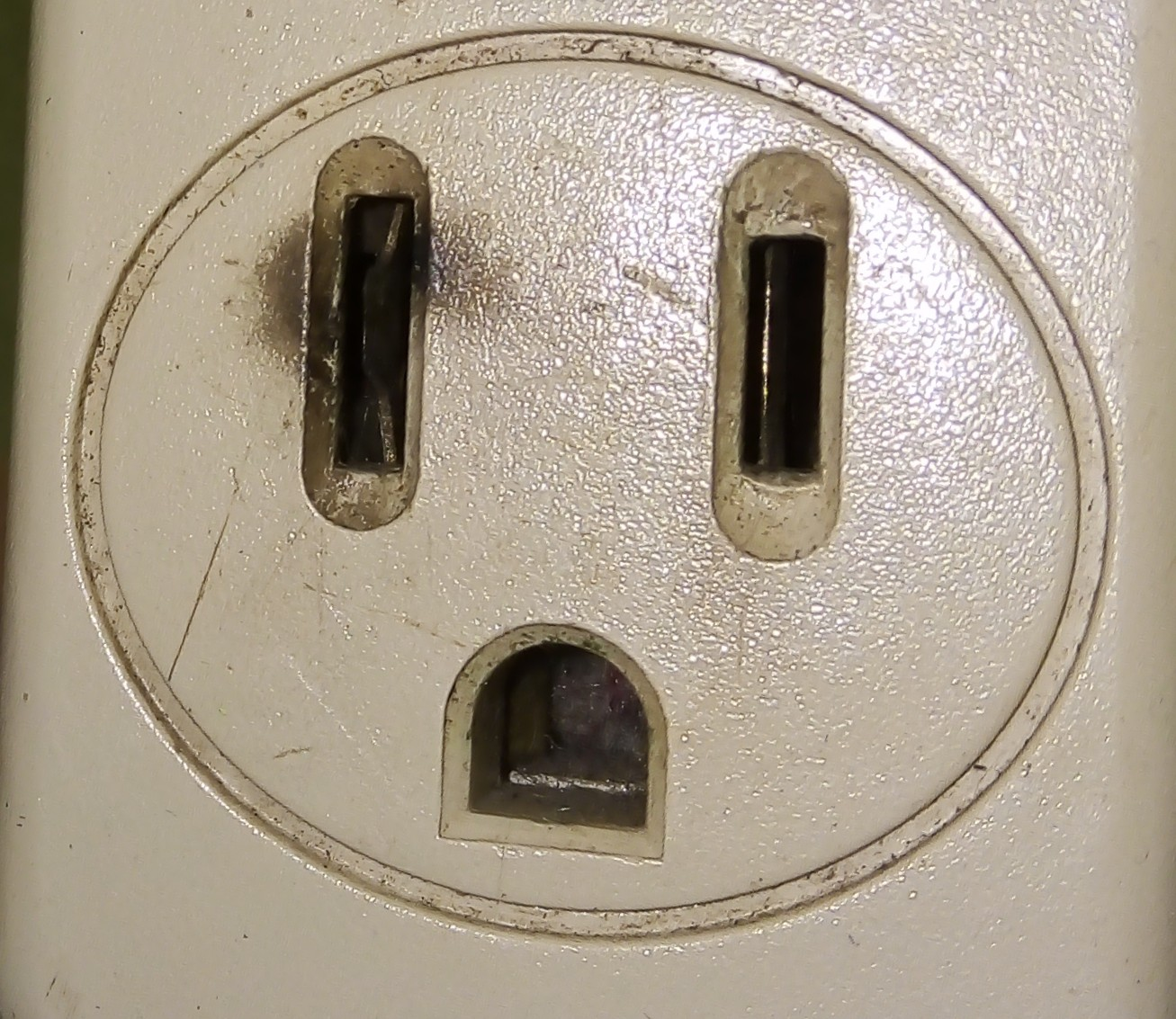
A burn in a plug caused by an electric arc during a short circuit.

Undesired or unintended electric arcing can have detrimental effects on electric power transmission, distribution systems and electronic equipment. Devices which may cause arcing include switches, circuit breakers, relay contacts, fuses and poor cable terminations. When an inductive circuit is switched off, the current cannot instantaneously jump to zero: a transient arc will be formed across the separating contacts. Switching devices susceptible to arcing are normally designed to contain and extinguish an arc, and snubber circuits can supply a path for transient currents, preventing arcing. If a circuit has enough current and voltage to sustain an arc formed outside of a switching device, the arc can cause damage to equipment such as melting of conductors, destruction of insulation, and fire. An arc flash describes an explosive electrical event that presents a hazard to people and equipment.

Undesired arcing in electrical contacts of contactors, relays and switches can be reduced by devices such as contact arc suppressors and RC snubbers or through techniques including:

- immersion in transformer oil, dielectric gas or vacuum
- arc chutes
- magnetic blowouts
- pneumatic blowouts
- sacrificial ("arcing") contacts
- damping materials to absorb arc energy, either thermally or through chemical decomposition

Arcing can also occur when a low resistance channel (foreign object, conductive dust, moisture...) forms between places with different voltage. The conductive channel then can facilitate formation of an electric arc. The ionized air has high electrical conductivity approaching that of metals, and it can conduct extremely high currents, causing a short circuit and tripping protective devices (fuses and circuit breakers). A similar situation may occur when a lightbulb burns out and the fragments of the filament pull an electric arc between the leads inside the bulb, leading to overcurrent that trips the breakers.

An electric arc over the surface of plastics causes their degradation. A conductive carbon-rich track tends to form in the arc path, called "carbon tracking", negatively influencing their insulation properties. The arc susceptibility, or "track resistance", is tested according to ASTM D495, by point electrodes and continuous and intermittent arcs; it is measured in seconds required to form a track that is conductive under high-voltage low-current conditions. Some materials are less susceptible to degradation than others. For example, polytetrafluoroethylene has arc resistance of about 200 seconds (3.3 minutes). From thermosetting plastics, alkyds and melamine resins are better than phenolic resins. Polyethylenes have arc resistance of about 150 seconds; polystyrenes and polyvinyl chlorides have relatively low resistance of about 70 seconds. Plastics can be formulated to emit gases with arc-extinguishing properties; these are known as arc-extinguishing plastics.

Arcing over some types of printed circuit boards, possibly due to cracks of the traces or the failure of a solder joint, renders the affected insulating layer conductive as the dielectric is combusted due to the high temperatures involved. This conductivity prolongs the arcing due to cascading failure of the surface.

== Arc suppression ==
Arc suppression is a method of attempting to reduce or eliminate an electrical arc. There are several possible areas of use of arc suppression methods, among them metal film deposition and sputtering, arc flash protection, electrostatic processes where electrical arcs are not desired (such as powder painting, air purification, PVDF film poling) and contact current arc suppression. In industrial, military and consumer electronic design, the latter method generally applies to devices such as electromechanical power switches, relays and contactors. In this context, arc suppression uses contact protection.

Part of the energy of an electrical arc forms new chemical compounds from the air surrounding the arc: these include oxides of nitrogen and ozone, the second of which can be detected by its distinctive sharp smell. These chemicals can be produced by high-power contacts in relays and motor commutators, and they are corrosive to nearby metal surfaces. Arcing also erodes the surfaces of the contacts, wearing them down and creating high contact resistance when closed.

== Health hazards ==
Exposure to an arc-producing device can pose health hazards. An arc formed in air will ionize oxygen and nitrogen, which then can re-form into reactive molecules such as ozone and nitric oxide. These products can be damaging to the mucous membranes. Plants are also susceptible to ozone poisoning. These hazards are greatest when the arc is continuous and in an enclosed space such as a room. An arc that occurs outside is less of a hazard because the heated ionized gases will rise up into the air and dissipate into the atmosphere. Spark gaps which only intermittently produce short spark bursts are also minimally hazardous because the volume of ions generated is very small.

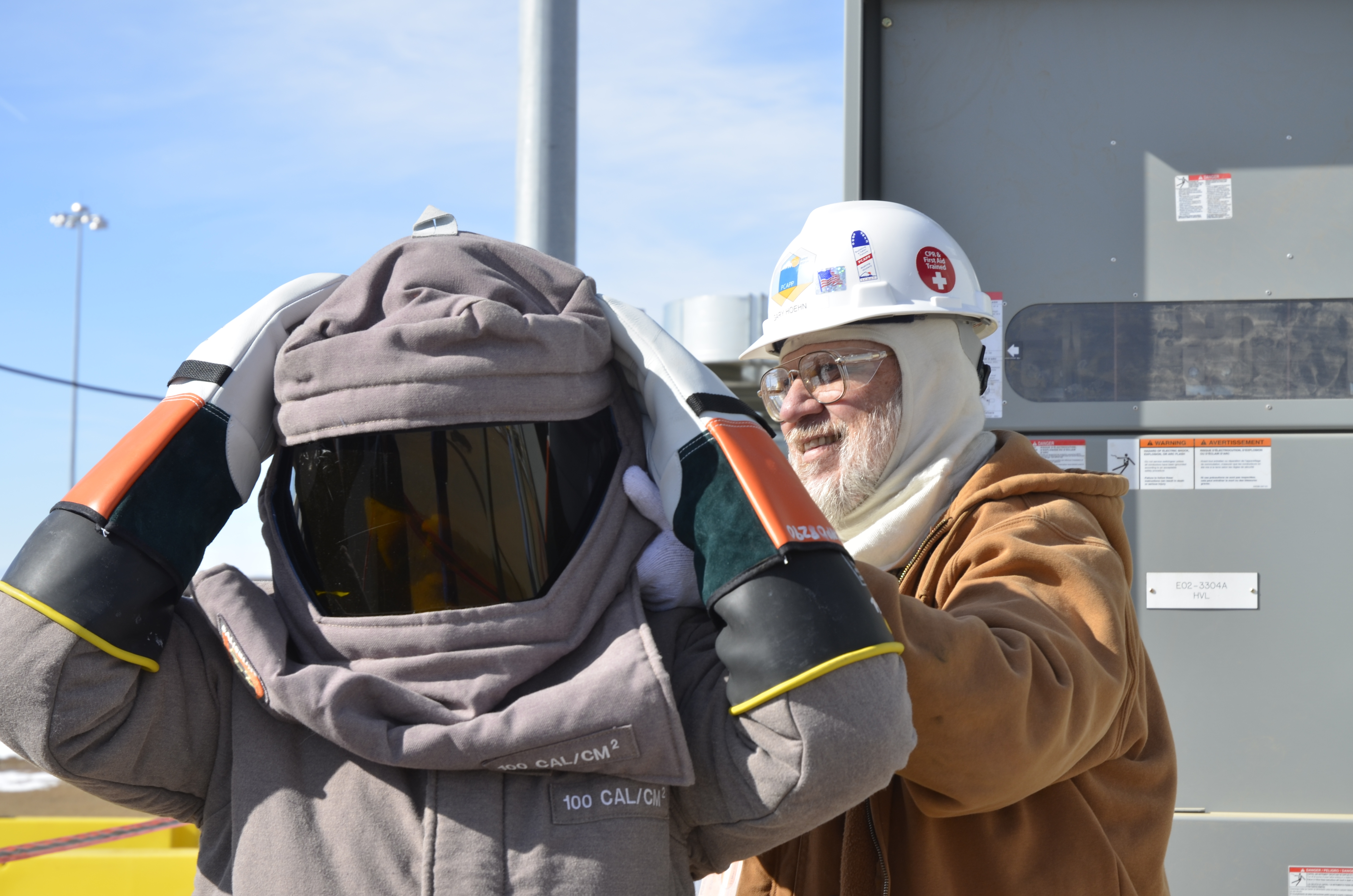
An electrician assists a fellow worker to suit up in special arc flash protection gear in preparation for an electrical inspection.

Arcs can also produce a broad spectrum of wavelengths spanning the visible light and the invisible ultraviolet and infrared spectrum. Very intense arcs generated by means such as arc welding can produce significant amounts of ultraviolet radiation which is damaging to the cornea of the observer and can cause sunburn. These arcs should only be observed through special dark filters such as a welding helmet which reduce the arc intensity and shield the observer's eyes from the ultraviolet rays, and exposed skin should be covered with clothing.

Arc flashes from high-current electrical equipment are very hazardous. They can violently eject plasma and molten metal, the intense radiation can rapidly ignite clothing and cause fatal burns even from some distance, and a high pressure blast can occur. Work in close proximity to equipment that can cause such an arc flash requires protective equipment that is rated to resist the amount of energy that could be released in the case of a fault.

== See also ==
- Lightning rod
- Arc transmitter
- List of light sources
- Marx generator
- Spark gap
- Vacuum arc
- Paschen's law
