= Arc suppression =

Reduction of electric arcing

Arc suppression is the reduction of the electric arc energy that occurs when current-carrying contacts are opened and closed. An electric arc is a man-made, continuous arc-discharge consisting of highly energized electrons and ions supported by an electric current of at least 100mA; not to be confused with an electric spark.

== Overview ==
Every time an electrical power device (for example: heaters, lamps, motors, transformers or similar power loads) turns on or off, its switch, relay or contactor transitions either from a CLOSED to an OPEN state ("BREAK") or from an OPEN to a CLOSED state ("MAKE"), under load, an electrical arc occurs between the two contact points (electrodes) of the switch.

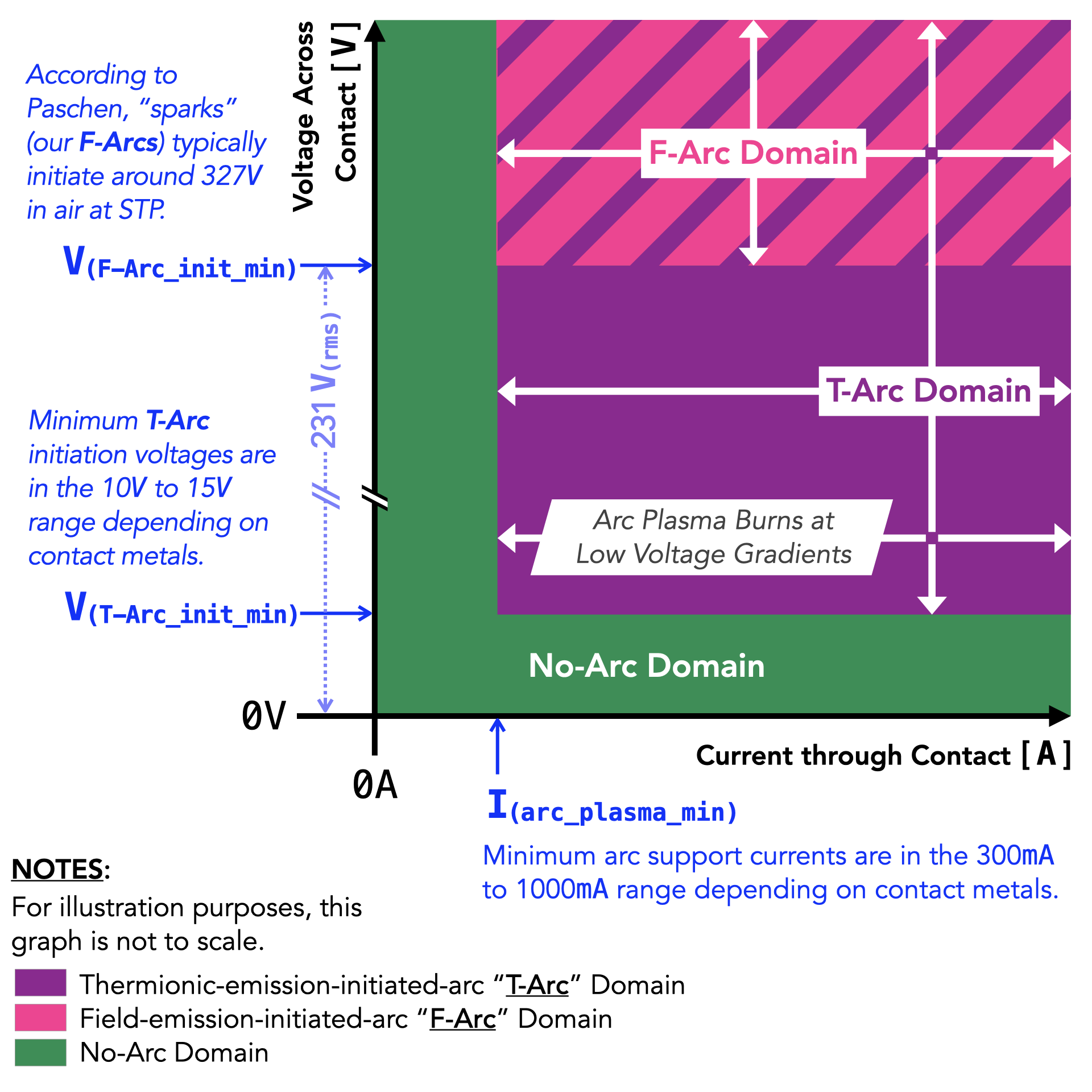
The Domains of Existence for Thermionic-Emission-Initiated Arcs ("T-Arcs") and Electron-Field-Emission-Initiated-Arcs ("F-Arcs")

The temperature of the resulting electric arc is very high (tens of thousands of degrees), causing the metal on the contact surfaces to melt, pool and migrate with the current. The high temperature of the arc causes dissociation of the surrounding gas molecules creating ozone, carbon monoxide, and other compounds. The arc energy slowly destroys the contact metal, causing some material to escape into the air as fine particulate matter. This very activity causes the material in the contacts to degrade quickly, resulting in device failure.

Understanding arc suppression requires an understanding of both arcing and arc initiation mechanisms. Contact arcs are either a Thermionic-Emission-Initiated-Arc ("T-Arc") or a Field-Emissions-Initiated-Arc ("F-Arc"), and are maintained by a continuous supply of power (think of an arc welder or a Xenon arc lamp).:

1. The T-Arc is born out of Current and initiates around V_{(T-Arc_init_min)}, and the T-Arc plasma is maintained at or above the minimum-arc-current of I_{(arc_plasma_min)}.
2. The F-Arc is born out of Voltage and initiates around V_{(F-Arc_init_min)}, and the F-Arc plasma is maintained at or above the minimum-arc-current of I_{(arc_plasma_min)}.

While arcing occurs during both the BREAK and MAKE transitions, the break arc is typically more energetic and thus more destructive.

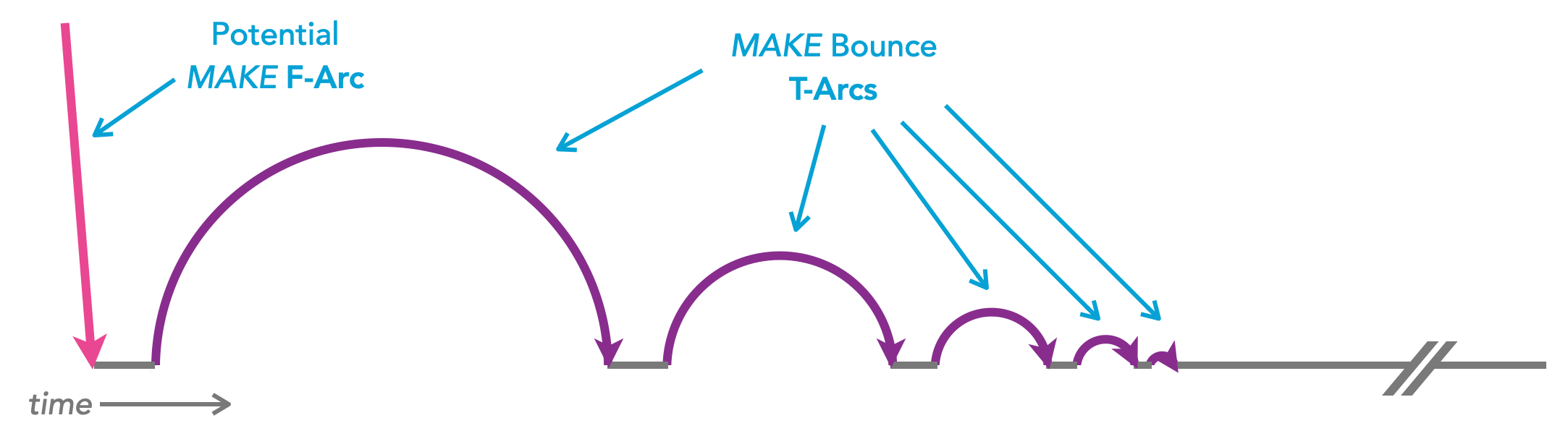
Potential MAKE F-Arc plasma extinguishes with the initial MAKE contact impact, followed by a series of MAKE-bounce-T-Arcs.

=== Arcing initiated during contact MAKE ===
During contact MAKE, F-Arc initiation occurs as the moving electrode nears the stationary electrode. Then the MAKE F-Arc plasma ignites and is promptly extinguished at the instant of contact impact. This initial impact results in a series of plasma pressure amplified MAKE bounces, with each bounce yielding a T-Arc. These bounces continue until the contact is micro-welded in the CLOSED position. (Note that "arc suppression" does not mean "arc elimination", as some tiny arcs ("arclets") yield beneficial micro-welds. These micro-welds are a desired and important power contact feature as they ensure vibration-resistant, low ohmic, and non-permanent electrode connections.)

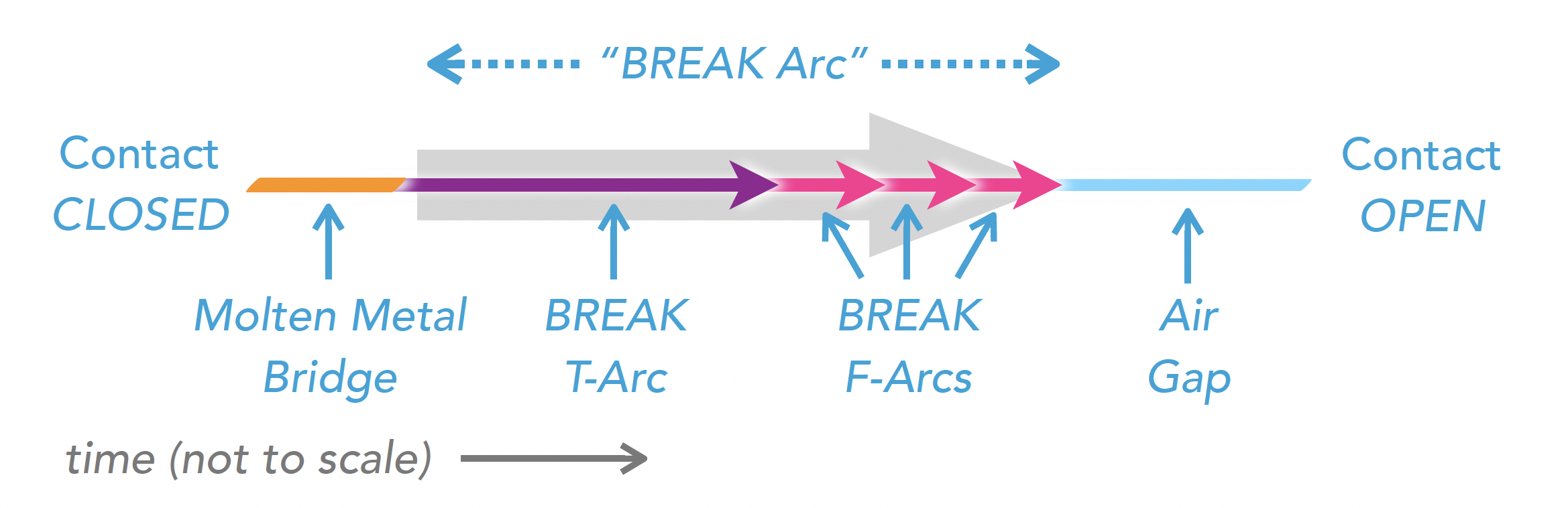
The "BREAK Arc" consists of an initial BREAK T-Arc, and is then extended by from one to possibly thousands of BREAK F-Arcs until the contact comes to rest in the OPEN state.

=== Arcing initiated during contact BREAK ===
The "BREAK Arc" consists of an initial BREAK T-Arc that may be extended by a series of BREAK F-arcs. The initial BREAK T-Arc is created after the explosion of the super-heated molten-metal bridge that had been carrying current as the contact begins to open. As the BREAK T-Arc plasma extinguishes and current is interrupted, inductance in the loop extends the duration of the "BREAK Arc" by initiating a series of BREAK F-Arcs which continue until the contact gap widens beyond the thermodynamic ability to support the burning plasma.

== Uses ==
There are several possible areas of use of arc suppression methods, among them metal film deposition and sputtering, electrostatic processes where electrical arcs are not desired (such as powder painting, air purification, and contact current arc suppression. In industrial, military and consumer electronic design, the latter method generally applies to devices such as electromechanical power switches, relays and contactors. In this context, arc suppression is contact protection.

=== Contact protection ===
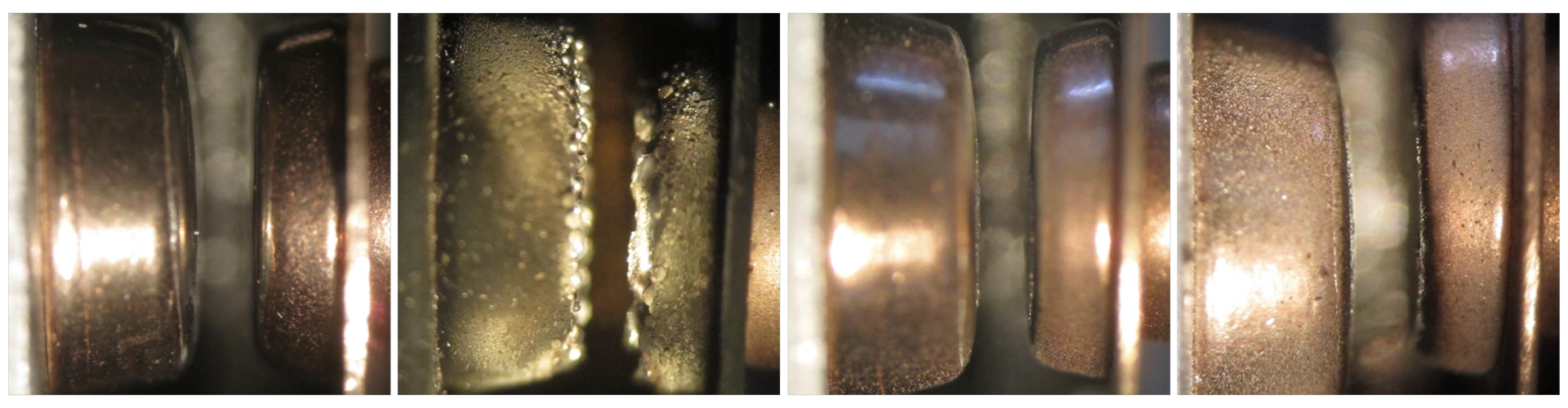
Physical effects of contact arcing - from left to right: pristine unused contact; failed contact after < 100 k unsuppressed cycles (i.e., typical use); used contact in excellent shape after 100 k suppressed cycles; used contact still in excellent shape after 1 million suppressed cycles (a 10x improvement).

Contact protection methods are designed to mitigate the wear and degradation occurring during the intended use of contacts within an electromechanical switch, relay or contactor and thus avoid an excessive increase in contact resistance or premature switch failure.

Arc suppression is an area of interest in engineering due to the destructive effects of the electrical arc to electromechanical power switches, relays and contactors' points of contact. There are many forms of "arc suppression" that provide contact protection in applications operating at less than 1 Ampere. Most of these, however, are more accurately considered "transient suppression" and are therefore ineffective for either arc suppression or contact protection.

== Effectiveness ==
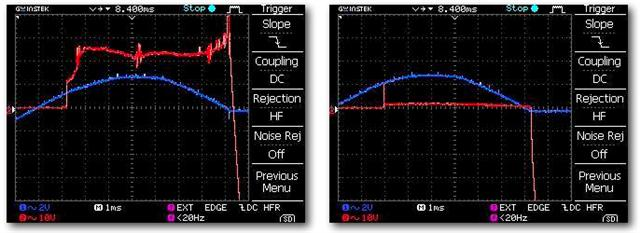
Screen captures from an oscilloscope measuring the arc energy: current shown by blue line (sinusoidal wave), 2V/div = 5A/div; voltage shown by red line,10V/div. (left) Unsuppressed AC power electrical arc (right) An identical arc with suppression.

The efficacy of an arc suppression solution for contact protection can be assessed using the Contact Arc Suppression Factor ("CASF") to compare the calculated arc energy of the unsuppressed arc with that of the suppressed arc:

CASF = W_{(arc)} / W_{(arclet)}

Where W_{(arc)} = Unsuppressed arc energy and W_{(arclet)} = Suppressed arc energy. The unsuppressed and suppressed arc energy must be obtained graphically from oscilloscope measurements. The unsuppressed and suppressed arc energy is expressed in Watt seconds [Ws] or Joules [J]. The resulting Contact Arc Suppression Factor [CASF] is dimensionless.

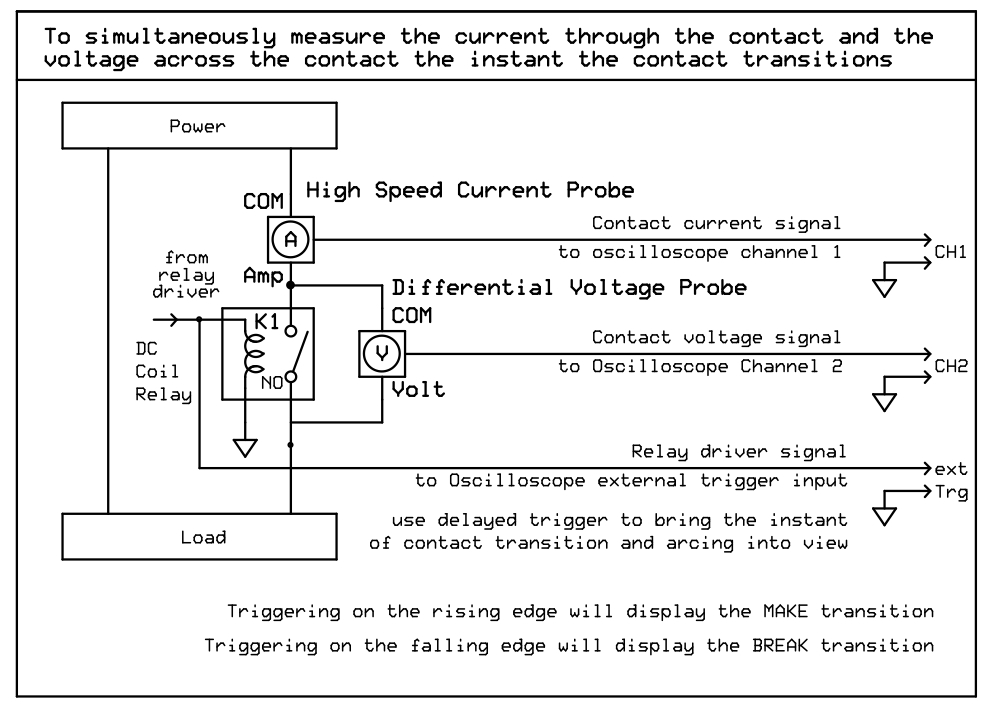
Contact Arc Suppression Factor (CASF) test set-up. The results obtained using this test set-up allow for determining the effectiveness of a contact arc suppression on either an electromechanical relay or a contactor.

W_{(arc)} = V_{(arc)} × I_{(arc)} × T_{(arc)}

Where V_{(arc)}: Arc burn voltage, I_{(arc)}: Arc burn current, is approximately I_{(load)}, where I_{(load)} may be in the range from a few Ampere [A] to kilo Ampere [kA]; and T_{(arc)}: Arc burn duration, can be on the order of microseconds [μs] to seconds [s].

W_{(arclet)} = V_{(arclet)} × I_{(arclet)} × T_{(arclet)}

Where V_{(arclet)}: Arc ignition voltage, depending on the contact metal. E.g. about 12V for silver indium tin oxide; I_{(arclet)}: Arclet current, is approximately I_{(load)} and may be in the range from a few Ampere [A] to kilo Ampere [kA]; and T_{(arclet)}: Arclet burn duration, is on the order of a few microseconds [μs].

Electrical arcing across the contacts of an electromechanical relay may be effectively measured using an oscilloscope connected to a differential voltage probe across the relay contacts and a high speed current probe to measure the current through the contacts during operation under load.

Alternatively, the electrical arc may also be visually observed on an electromechanical power switch, relay and contactor, with visible contacts, while the contacts are opening and closing under load.

== Common devices ==
Common devices that may be reasonably effective arc suppressors in applications operating below 2 Amperes include capacitors, snubbers, diodes, Zener diodes, varistors, and transient voltage suppressors. Contact arc suppression solutions that are considered effective in applications operating at more than 2 Amperes include:

1. Electronic Power Contact Arc Suppressor
2. Solid state relays are not electromechanical, have no contacts, and, thus, do not create electrical arcs.
3. Hybrid power relays
4. Hybrid power contactors

== Specialized devices ==
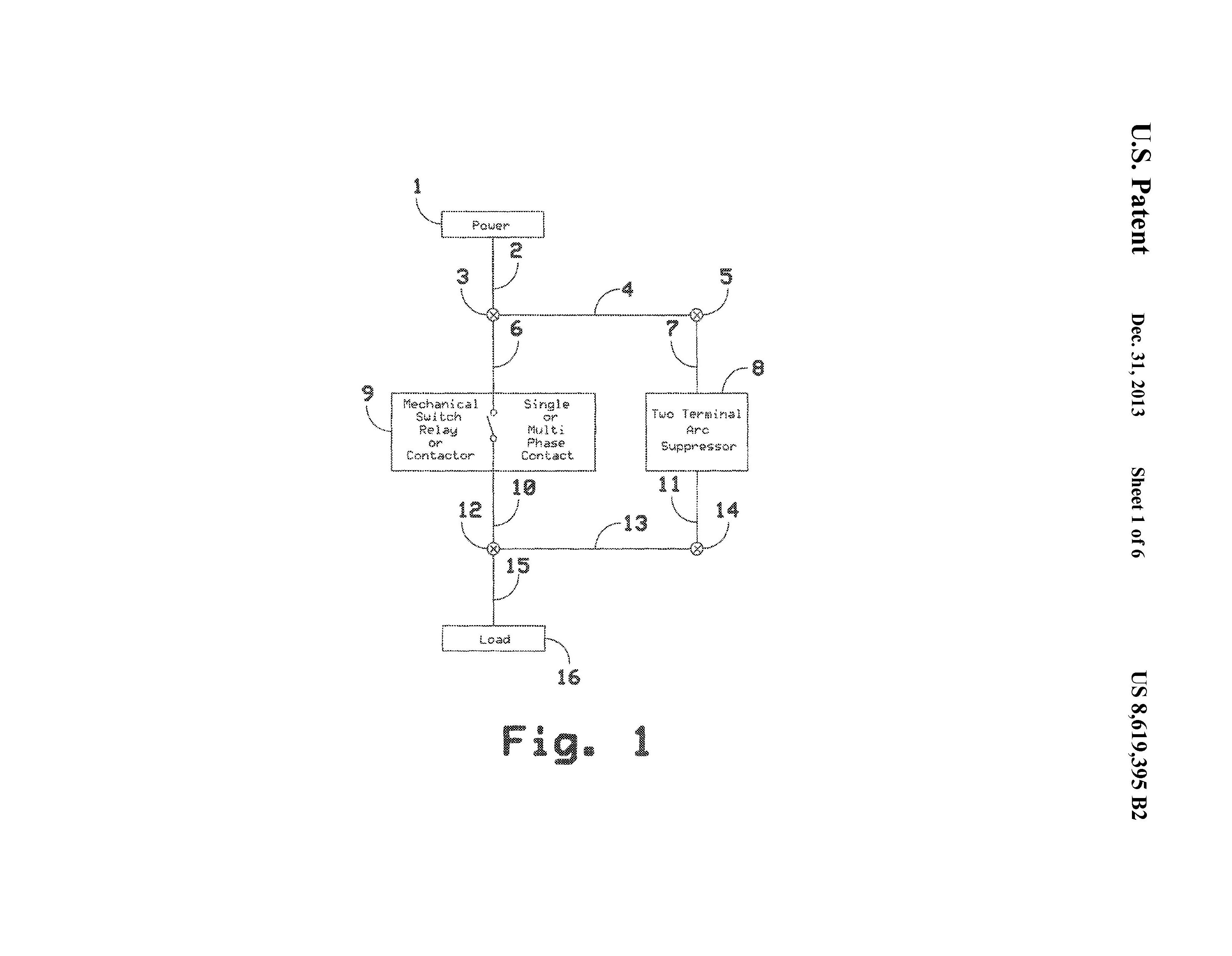
An electronic power contact arc suppressor attached in parallel across the contact of a relay or contactor (Fig. 1 of issued patent U.S. 8,619,395 B2)

The circuit diagram is part of an issued patent for an electronic power contact arc suppressor intended to protect the contacts of electrical relays or contactors. It suppresses arcs by providing an alternate path around contacts as they open or close.

Some contact arc suppressors operate connected solely across the protected contact, while other contact arc suppressors are also connected to the coil of the contactor to provide the suppressor with additional input about contact operation.

== Benefits of arc suppression ==
Arc suppression techniques can produce a number of benefits:

1. Minimized contact damage from arcing and therefore reduced maintenance, repair and replacement frequency.
2. Increased contact reliability.
3. Reduced heat generation resulting in less heat management measures such as venting and fans.
4. Reduced ozone and pollutant emissions.
5. Reduced electromagnetic interference (EMI) from arcs - a common source of radiated EMI.

== See also ==
- Contact protection
