= Powder painting =

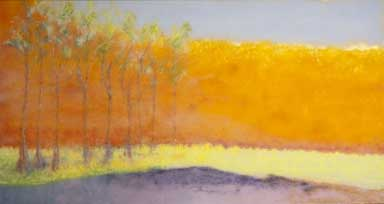
18"x34" powder painting by Jim Boles, homage to Wolf Kahn.

Powder painting, also called Frit painting, is the art of using ground glass in powdered form to create kilnformed glass art. The process differs from enameling in many respects. Firstly, the powder is actually ground glass typically from a single manufacturer who supplies an extensive color palette. Large jars can be purchased which are fairly inexpensive compared to enamels, making large scale paintings possible.

This technique is one variation of many ways to create images on glass using glass bits (frits), and in this case powder.

== The process ==
The process is fairly simple whereby the dry powders are arranged on sheet glass in any desired pattern or design. The glass is then fired in a kiln only to the point of making the powder stick to the glass, leaving the powder in what appears to be a soft powdery form as opposed fully fusing the powders into the glass.

== Advantages ==
Many factors give this technique considerable advantages:

Powders applied thickly can be textured with brush strokes and other tools, and lines patterns drawn into the powder.

Since large scale images are possible the artist's hand can be seen in the application of the powders as drizzles, smears, sprays much like an actual painting.

There is no chemical reaction between the glasses since the powder does not go to full fuse. This makes it possible for any color to 'touch' any other color without there being a chemical reaction between colors which often results in muddy colors.

Powders can be mixed to form whole new hues, tints, shades and gradations. This expands the artists palette infinitely, bringing the glass artists closer to actual painting.

Powders can go on wet if mixed with water and then allowed to dry. This adds to the texturing possibilities depending on what tools are used to apply the wet media.

The powders can be applied in layers and subsequently selectively removed in layers using a small vacuum creating interesting patterns.

Glass can be pre-fired with a base colors or patterns, then powders applied on top giving the opportunity to have both shiny areas and soft powdery areas in the finished piece.

The powders can be applied thinly or thick to opacity. If applied thinly then what is underneath (a prefire) can show through yielding an added dimension.

Another dimension is the addition of reverse side effects. The opposite side of the glass can be prefired with colors, painted with normal oils or acrylics, or gold- or silver-plated. Depending on the opacity level of the font's powders the color or reflection of light from gold leafing can add an interesting inner glow.

== See also ==
- Fritography
- Powder coating on glass
