= Electrothermal-chemical technology =

Plasma ignition of projectile propellent

Electrothermal-chemical (ETC) technology is an attempt to increase accuracy and muzzle energy of future tank, artillery, and close-in weapon system guns by improving the predictability and rate of expansion of propellants inside the barrel.

An electrothermal-chemical gun uses a plasma cartridge to ignite and control the ammunition's propellant, using electrical energy to trigger the process. ETC increases the performance of conventional solid propellants, reduces the effect of temperature on propellant expansion and allows for more advanced, higher density propellants to be used.

The technology has been under development since the mid-1980s and in 1993 was actively being researched in the United States by the Army Research Laboratory, Sandia National Laboratories and defense industry contractors, including FMC Corporation, General Dynamics Land Systems, Olin Ordnance, and Soreq Nuclear Research Center. It is possible that electrothermal-chemical gun propulsion will be an integral part of US Army's future combat system and those of other countries such as Germany and the United Kingdom. Electrothermal-chemical technology is part of a broad research and development program that encompasses all electric gun technology, such as railguns and coil guns.

== Background ==
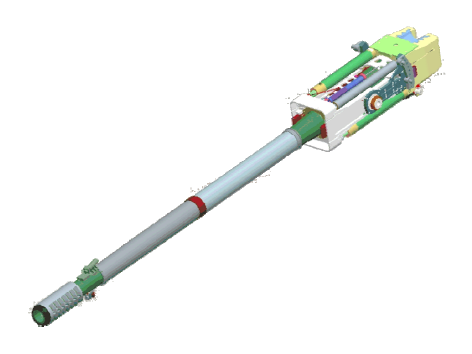
The XM360.

The constant battle between armour and armor-piercing round has led to continuous development of the main battle tank design. The evolution of American anti-tank weapons can be traced back to requirements to combat Soviet tanks. In the late 1980s, it was thought that the protection level of the Future Soviet Tank (FST) could exceed 700 mm of rolled homogeneous armour equivalence at its maximum thickness, which was effectively immune against the contemporary M829 armour piercing fin stabilized discarding sabot. In the 1980s the most immediate method available to NATO to counter Soviet advances in armour technology was the adoption of a 140 mm main gun, but this required a redesigned turret that could incorporate the larger breech and ammunition, and it also required some sort of automatic loader. Although the 140 mm gun was considered a real interim solution, it was decided after the fall of the Soviet Union that the increase in muzzle energy it provided was not worth the increase in weight. Resources were therefore spent on research into other programs that could provide the needed muzzle energy. One of the most successful alternative technologies remains electrothermal-chemical ignition.

Most proposed advances in gun technology are based on the assumption that the solid propellant as a stand-alone propulsion system is no longer capable of delivering the required muzzle energy. This requirement has been underscored by the appearance of the Russian T-90 main battle tank. The elongation of current gun tubes, such as the new German 120 mm L/55, which was introduced by Rheinmetall is considered only an interim solution as it does not offer the required increase in muzzle velocity. Even advanced kinetic energy ammunition such as the United States' M829A3 is considered only an interim solution against future threats. To that extent the solid propellant is considered to have reached the end of its usefulness, although it will remain the principal propulsion method for at least the next decade until newer technologies mature.

ETC technology offers a medium-risk upgrade and is developed to the point that further improvements are so minor that it can be considered mature. The lightweight American 120 mm XM291 came close to achieving 17 MJ of muzzle energy, which is the lower-end muzzle energy spectrum for a 140 mm gun. However, the success of the XM291 does not imply the success of ETC technology as there are key parts of the propulsion system that are not yet understood or fully developed, such as the plasma ignition process. Nevertheless, there is substantial existing evidence that ETC technology is viable and worth the money to continue development. Furthermore, it can be integrated into current gun systems.

== Operational principle ==
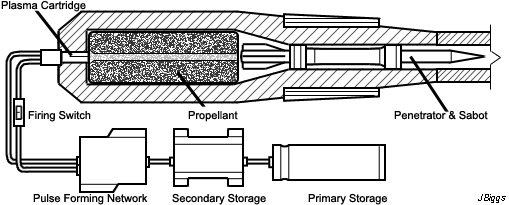
A diagram of a working electrothermal-chemical gun.

An electrothermal-chemical gun uses a plasma cartridge to ignite and control the ammunition's propellant, using electrical energy as a catalyst to begin the process. Originally researched by Dr. Jon Parmentola for the U.S. Army, it has grown into a very plausible successor to a standard solid propellant tank gun. Since the beginning of research the United States has funded the XM291 gun project with US$4,000,000, basic research with US$300,000, and applied research with US$600,000. Since then it has been proven to work, although efficiency to the level required has not yet been accomplished. ETC increases the performance of conventional solid propellants, reduces the effect of temperature on propellant expansion and allows for more advanced, higher density propellants to be used. It will also reduce pressure placed on the barrel in comparison to alternative technologies that offer the same muzzle energy given the fact that it helps spread the propellant's gas much more smoothly during ignition. Currently, there are two principal methods of plasma initiation: the flashboard large area emitter (FLARE) and the triple coaxial plasma igniter (TCPI).

=== Flashboard large area emitter ===
Flashboards run in several parallel strings to provide a large area of plasma or ultraviolet radiation and uses the breakdown and vaporization of gaps of diamonds to produce the required plasma. These parallel strings are mounted in tubes and oriented to have their gaps azimuthal to the tube's axis. It discharges by using high pressure air to move air out of the way. FLARE initiators can ignite propellants through the release of plasma, or even through the use of ultraviolet heat radiation. The absorption length of a solid propellant is sufficient to be ignited by radiation from a plasma source. However, FLARE has most likely not reached optimal design requirements and further understanding of FLARE and how it works is completely necessary to ensure the evolution of the technology. If FLARE provided the XM291 gun project with the sufficient radiative heat to ignite the propellant to achieve a muzzle energy of 17 MJ one could only imagine the possibilities with a fully developed FLARE plasma igniter. Current areas of study include how plasma will affect the propellant through radiation, the deliverance of mechanical energy and heat directly and by driving gas flow. Despite these daunting tasks FLARE has been seen as the most plausible igniter for future application on ETC guns.

=== Triple coaxial plasma igniter ===
A coaxial igniter consists of a fully insulated conductor, covered by four strips of aluminium foil. All of this is further insulated in a tube about 1.6 cm in diameter that is perforated with small holes. The idea is to use an electrical flow through the conductor and then exploding the flow into vapour and then breaking it down into plasma. Consequently, the plasma escapes through the constant perforations throughout the insulating tube and initiates the surrounding propellant. A TCPI igniter is fitted in individual propellant cases for each round of ammunition. However, TCPI is no longer considered a viable method of propellant ignition because it may damage the fins and does not deliver energy as efficiently as a FLARE igniter.

== Feasibility ==
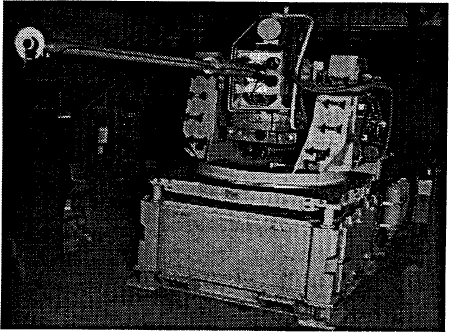
The 60 mm ETC gun developed by the US Navy at FMC as an ETC CIWS proof of principle demonstrator.

The XM291 is the best existing example of a working electrothermal-chemical gun. It was an alternative technology to the heavier caliber 140 mm gun by using the dual-caliber approach. It uses a breech that is large enough to accept 140 mm ammunition and be mounted with both a 120 mm barrel and a 135 mm or 140 mm barrel. The XM291 also mounts a larger gun tube and a larger ignition chamber than the existing M256 L/44 main gun. Through the application of electrothermal-chemical technology the XM291 has been able to achieve muzzle energy outputs that equate that to a low-level 140 mm gun, while achieving muzzle velocities greater than those of the larger 140 mm gun. Although the XM291 does not mean that ETC technology is viable it does offer an example that it is possible.

ETC requires much less energy input from outside sources, like a battery, than a railgun or a coilgun would. Tests have shown that energy output by the propellant is higher than energy input from outside sources on ETC guns. In comparison, a railgun currently cannot achieve a higher muzzle velocity than the amount of energy input. Even at 50% efficiency a rail gun launching a projectile with a kinetic energy of 20 MJ would require an energy input into the rails of 40 MJ, and 50% efficiency has not yet been achieved. To put this into perspective, a rail gun launching at 9 MJ of energy would need roughly 32 MJ worth of energy from capacitors. Current advances in energy storage allow for energy densities as high as 2.5 MJ/dm^{3}, which means that a battery delivering 32 MJ of energy would require a volume of 12.8 dm^{3} per shot; this is not a viable volume for use in a modern main battle tank, especially one designed to be lighter than existing models. There has even been discussion about eliminating the necessity for an outside electrical source in ETC ignition by initiating the plasma cartridge through a small explosive force.

Furthermore, ETC technology is not only applicable to solid propellants. To increase muzzle velocity even further electrothermal-chemical ignition can work with liquid propellants, although this would require further research into plasma ignition. ETC technology is also compatible with existing projects to reduce the amount of recoil delivered to the vehicle while firing. Understandably, recoil of a gun firing a projectile at 17 MJ or more will increase directly with the increase in muzzle energy in accordance to Newton's third law of motion and successful implementation of recoil reduction mechanisms will be vital to the installation of an ETC powered gun in an existing vehicle design. For example, OTO Melara's new lightweight 120 mm L/45 gun has achieved a recoil force of 25 t by using a longer recoil mechanism (550 mm) and a pepperpot muzzle brake. Reduction in recoil can also be achieved through mass attenuation of the thermal sleeve. The ability of ETC technology to be applied to existing gun designs means that for future gun upgrades there's no longer the necessity to redesign the turret to include a larger breech or caliber gun barrel.

Several countries have already determined that ETC technology is viable for the future and have funded indigenous projects considerably. These include the United States, Germany and the United Kingdom, amongst others. The United States' XM360, which was planned to equip the Future Combat Systems Mounted Combat System light tank and may be the M1 Abrams' next gun upgrade, is reportedly based on the XM291 and may include ETC technology, or portions of ETC technology. Tests of this gun have been performed using "precision ignition" technology, which may refer to ETC ignition.

== Bibliography ==
- Diamond, P. (March 1999). Electro Thermal Chemical Gun Technology Study (Report). The MITRE Corporation. CiteSeerX 10.1.1.834.5851.
- Hilmes, Rolf (December 2004). "Arming Future MBTs - Some Considerations". Military Technology (12/2004). Moench Verlagsgesellschaft Mbh.
- Hilmes, Rolf (June 30, 1999). "Aspects of future MBT conception". Military Technology. 23 (6). Moench Verlagsgesellschaft Mbh.
- Hilmes, Rolf (January 1, 2001). "Battle Tanks for the Bundeswehr: Modern German Tank Development, 1956-2000". Armor (January–February 2001). Fort Knox: US Army Armor Center. ISSN 0004-2420.
- Horst, Albert W.; et al. (1997). "Recent advances in anti-armor technology". 35th Aerospace Sciences Meeting and Exhibit. American Institute of Aeronautics and Astronautics. doi:10.2514/6.1997-484.
- Kruse, Josef; et al. (April 1999). "Studies on Germany´s Future 140 mm Tank Gun Systems - Conventional and ETC -" (PDF). 34TH Gun & Ammunition Symposium & Exhibition. Rheinmetall. Archived (PDF) from the original on 2022-03-05 – via The Armor Site.
- Ogorkiewicz, Richard M. (December 1990). "Future tank guns Part I: solid and liquid propellant guns". International Defense Review (12/1990). Janes.
- Pengelley, Rupert (November 1989). "A new era in tank main armament: The options multiply". International Defense Review (11/1989). Janes.
- Ropelewski, Robert R. (February 1989). "Soviet Gains in Armor/Antiarmor Shape US Army Master Plan". Armed Forces Journal International. U.S. Army.
- Schemmer, Benjamin F. (May 1989). "Army, SecDef's Office at Loggerheads over Antiarmor". Armed Forces Journal International. U.S. Army.
- Sharoni, Asher H.; Lawrence D. Bacon (September 1, 1997). "The Future Combat System (FCS): Technology Evolution Review and Feasibility Assessment" (PDF). Armor. Fort Knox: US Army Armor Center. ISSN 0004-2420.
- Sauerwein, Brigitte (February 1990). "Rheinmetall's NPzK: Conventional technology for counterng future MBTs". International Defense Review (2/1990). Janes.
- Yangmeng, Tian; et al. A Novel Concept of Electrothermal Chemical Gun without Power Supply.
- Zahn, Brian R. (May 2000). The Future Combat System: Minimizing Risk While Maximizing Capability. Defense Technical Information Center (Report). Archived from the original on 2023-05-27.
