= Pennsylvania Railroad class E44 =

Class of 66 American electric locomotives

Pennsylvania Railroad E44
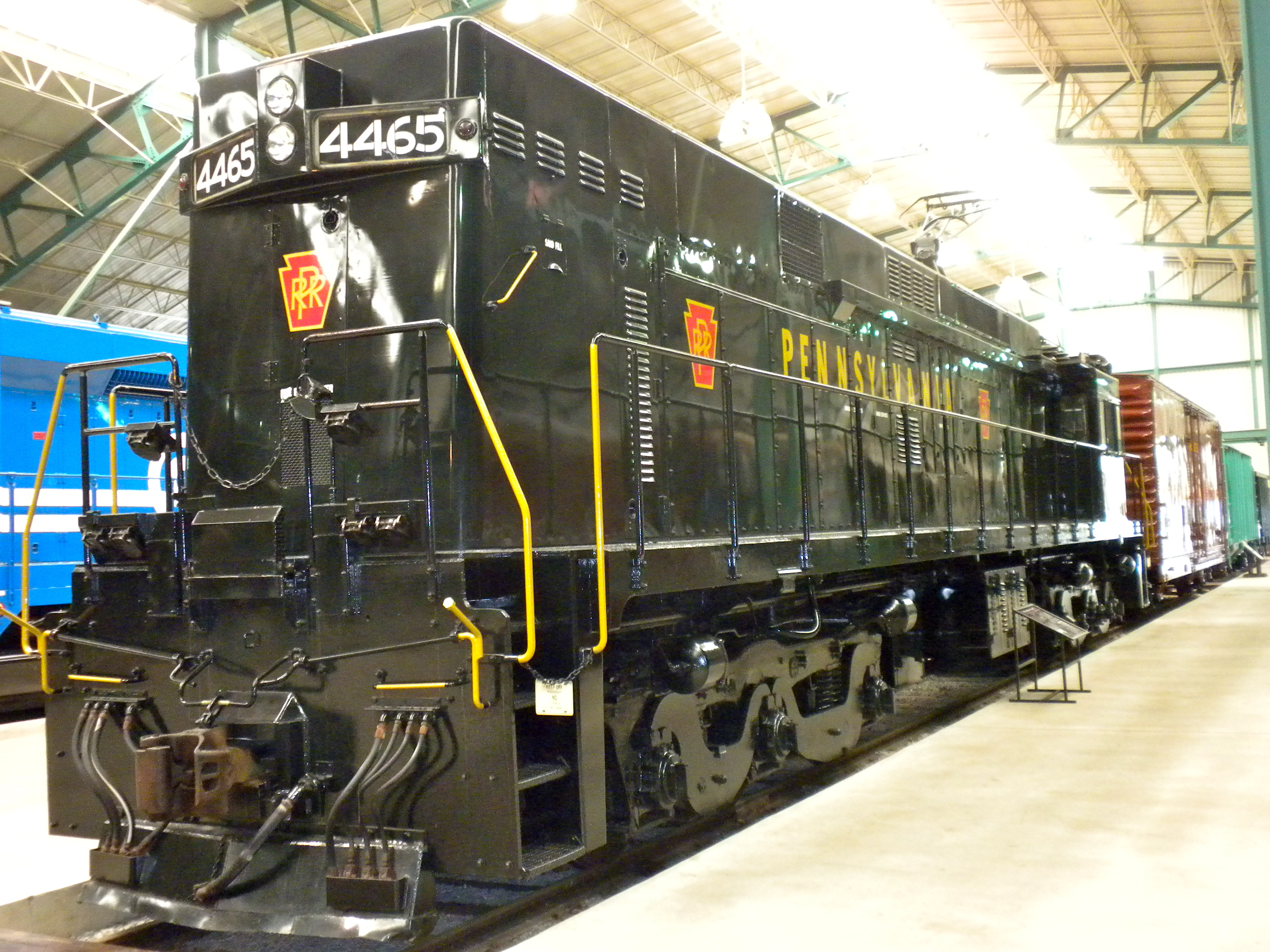
- Pennsylvania #4465, preserved at the Railroad Museum of Pennsylvania.
Type and origin
- Power type: Electric
- Builder: General Electric
- Build date: 1960–1963
- Total produced: 66
- Number rebuilt: 22 to E44a
Specifications
- Configuration
  - AAR: C-C
  - UIC: Co′Co′
- Gauge: 4 ft 8 1/2 in (1,435 mm) standard gauge
- Length: 69 ft 6 in (21.18 m)
- Width: 10 ft 0 in (3.05 m)
- Height: 15 ft 0 in (4.57 m) over pantograph locked down
- Axle load: 64,043 lb (29,049 kg; 29.049 t)
- Loco weight: 384,600 lb (174,500 kg; 174.5 t)
- Electric system/s: 11 kV 25 Hz AC
- Current pickup: Pantograph
- Traction motors: 6 GE Model 752 of 733 hp (547 kW) or 833 hp (621 kW) (E44a)
- Transmission: 11 kV AC fed through a tap changer supplying 12 Mercury arc Ignitron tube rectifiers (later Silicon diode rectifiers) providing power to 6 DC traction motors.
Performance figures
- Maximum speed: 70 mph (113 km/h)
- Power output: E44: 4,400 hp (3.28 MW); E44a: 5,000 hp (3.73 MW)
- Tractive effort: Continuous: 55,500 lbf (246.9 kN); Maximum: 96,150 lbf (427.7 kN)

The PRR E44 was an electric, rectifier-equipped locomotive built by General Electric for the Pennsylvania Railroad between 1960 and 1963. The PRR used them for freight service on the Northeast Corridor. They continued in service under Penn Central and Conrail until Conrail abandoned its electric operations in the early 1980s. They were then acquired by Amtrak and NJ Transit, where they lived short lives; all were retired by the mid-1980s. One is preserved at the Railroad Museum of Pennsylvania.

== Design ==
By the late 1950s, with its P5a fleet aging, the Pennsylvania Railroad needed new electric freight locomotives. In fact, the PRR had never really had a successful electric freight locomotive. The P5a was originally built to haul passengers, being bumped from that duty by the more powerful GG1. The GG1s were best at hauling passenger trains; while also adequate for fast, time-sensitive freights, they were not as efficient on heavy freights (especially coal and ore trains) at a time before roller bearings were widely used on freight cars. The PRR had purchased E2b, E2c and E3b demonstrators, but was not particularly impressed, for a variety of reasons. The railroad even considered complete freight dieselization, and commissioned studies on this from builders Alco, GM's EMD and General Electric; however, all three builders recommended retaining all existing electrification and acquiring new electric locomotives. The PRR took special note of twelve state-of-the-art EL-C electrics built by GE for the Virginian Railway, which was satisfied by their performance on their coal trains in the Blue Ridge Mountains. The PRR then approached GE about building a similar locomotive, resulting in an order for 66 such units in 1959.

The E44 was essentially a more powerful version of the EL-C (later known as the E33), with 4,400 horsepower (3.3 MW) compared to the EL-C's 3,300 horsepower (2.5 MW). One of the most notable differences in appearances between the two locomotives was the pantograph(s): the El-C had one double-arm (Stemmann) pantograph, whereas the E44 had two single-arm (Faiveley) pantographs: a characteristic born of the PRR's operating practice of having two pantographs per locomotive. The EL-C, while of utilitarian design, also had a slightly more-rounded appearance than the rather-boxier E44. While the E44 was short on aesthetics compared with the GG1 and P5 ("bricks" being a particularly common sobriquet), the units were long on performance.

General Electric constructed the first 60 E44s (4400-4459) using Ignitron rectifiers, and the final six units (4460-4465) with air-cooled silicon diode rectifiers. GE subsequently upgraded 22 of the units (a few at a time) to an E44a designation, boasting upgraded traction motors and silicon rectifier packages for an output of 5,000 horsepower. The 22 E44a's were numbered 4438-4459; the E44a program was terminated in 1970 due to the Penn Central bankruptcy. Conrail subsequently swapped out the Ignitrons in all of the remaining units for silicon diodes in the late 1970s and early 1980s, in-house and without any horsepower upgrades. In 1980, GE took E44a 4453 in hand for rebuilding with upgraded electronics and uprating to 6,000 horsepower. Made redundant by Conrail's discontinuance of electrified freight operations, the rebuilt 4453 was briefly tested on the Northeast Corridor in 1984 by GE, which then scrapped the unit several years later after salvaging the newer components.

=== E50C ===
In the late 1960s, General Electric constructed two upgraded 5,000 horsepower (25,000 volt, 60 cycle) units of the same E44 body style (known as E50Cs) for the Muskingum Electric Railroad, a private coal-carrying railroad owned by American Electric Power. Until it closed in 2002, Muskingum Electric shuttled coal in two automated consists from the mine to a powerplant at Relief, Ohio.

== History ==
The PRR took delivery of 66 E44s between 1960 and 1963. They quickly displaced the P5s. After the 1968 Penn Central merger, the E44s remained in freight service. They passed to the newly formed Conrail in 1976. The E44s were retired in 1981 when Conrail discontinued freight electrification. NJ Transit acquired some thereafter. Amtrak acquired eight E44 units from NJ Transit in June 1987, intending to use them for work train service. Although some were painted into Amtrak colors, they were never used due to leaks of PCB-containing coolant from their transformers. They were stored at Wilmington, Delaware, and sold in March 1993.

== Preservation ==
PRR No. 4465, the final production E44, is preserved at the Railroad Museum of Pennsylvania. 4465 was completed in July 1963, and later saw service with Amtrak as No. 502.
