= Muskingum Electric Railroad =

Defunct automated electric railroad

The Muskingum Electric Railroad was a private coal-carrying railroad owned by American Electric Power, and operated from 1968 to 2002.

The line was the first automated railroad in the U.S.

== Operations ==
The Muskingum Electric Railroad shuttled coal from Central Ohio Coal Company's Muskingum mine, (near Cumberland, Ohio) to the Muskingum River Power Plant at Relief, Ohio, a distance of 20 miles (32 km).

The coal was notably extracted by the largest dragline ever built, "Big Muskie", and was operated by the Central Ohio Coal Company.

The railroad began construction in 1967, with revenue operations beginning in February 1969. The railroad was active until 2002.

The trains did not leave the property, and were used solely for shuttling coal. Initially, the MERR maintained a connection with the Baltimore and Ohio Railroad, allowing for coal to be transported to the Philo Power Plant, however this only saw limited use as the plant would close in 1975. After this, it was only occasionally used for equipment deliveries.

== Rolling Stock ==
The trains were driverless, and powered by two automated General Electric E50C locomotives, numbered 100 and 200 respectively. Visually, the E50C's looked identical to the GE E44, with a notable difference being the former's lack of a second pantograph. The automation feature was inconsistent, and later operations were often fully human-controlled.

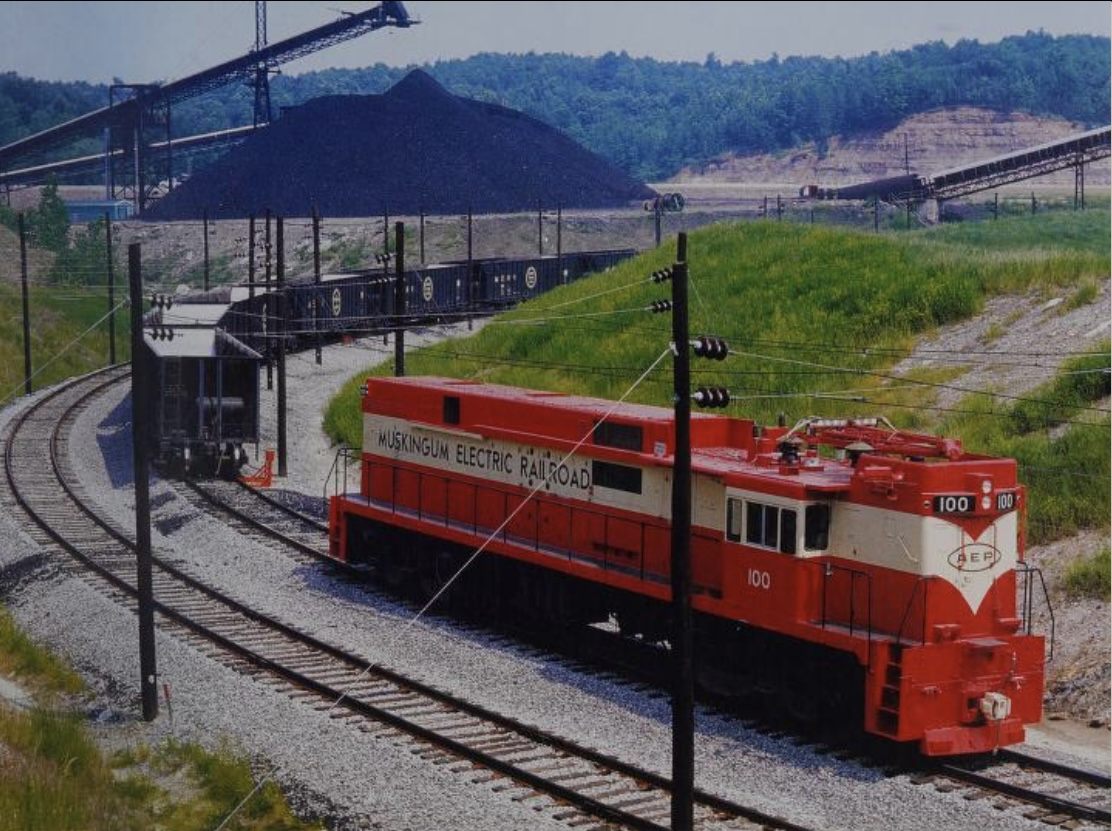
E50C #100 at the north-end coal-loop in 1969.

The railroad had one station, briefly carrying the name Brookfield, for the nearby Brookfield Township, but was later renamed Prentice. It was located just south of Cumberland, on OH-83. It was also adjacent to a small spur that connected to the railroad's own access track, connecting the electrified trackage to the Marietta branch. The station was not used for revenue passenger service, but instead made up a "visitor center" for the railroad and mine, which was built to resemble a railroad depot. The spur was used as a display for executive cars and locomotives; bearing Muskingum Electric Railroad and Ohio Power Co. lettering respectively. The building and executive cars were used as office space.

The two Pullman cars owned by the railroad, Dover Fort and Oak Lane, alongside two former Ohio Power Company locomotives, No. 2 and No. 3, were put on static display. Ohio Power Company No. 2, a fireless locomotive, previously operated at the Philo Power Plant as a yard switcher.

AEP would eventually donate the consist in 1982 to the Hocking Valley Scenic Railway, in Nelsonville, Ohio. The Dover Fort and both locomotives still reside at the railroad, with Ohio Power Company No. 3 being fully restored to operation in 2015. Ohio Power Company No. 2 remains in storage and is awaiting restoration. The Prentice station building was later moved to the nearby Ark Springs Baptist Church, where it still resides.

== Decline ==
In later years of the railroad, the coal loading area was moved much farther down the line, a result of the diminishing coal supply. This shortened the journey significantly, requiring only one train to shuttle coal. E50C 100 was retired as a result, and the rest of the line would go unused. This move was accounted for from the start of the railroad, as the northern end of mine only had around half as much recoverable coal from the rest.

The railroad closed in January 2002, and by 2004 was scrapped entirely. By this point, the mine had run out of economically recoverable coal, and the land was reclaimed shortly after, with a large portion becoming The Wilds. All of the operational rolling stock was also scrapped in 2004, which included both E50C's and hoppers.
