= New Haven EP-5 =

American electric locomotive

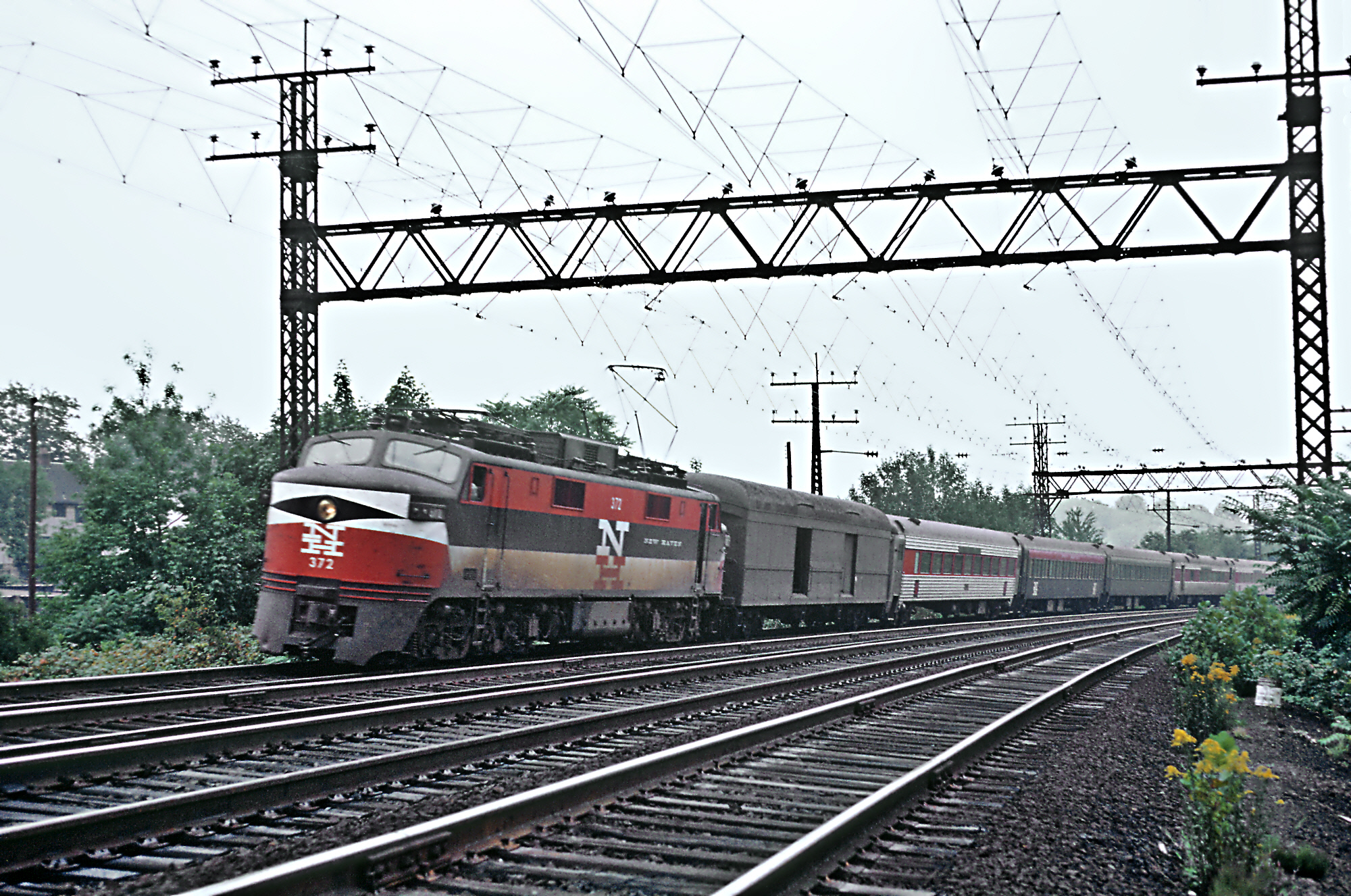
- New Haven #372 seen in September 1964
Type and origin
- Power type: Electric
- Builder: GE Transportation Systems
- Build date: 1954
- Total produced: 10
Specifications
- Configuration
  - AAR: C-C
  - UIC: Co'Co'
- Gauge: 4 ft 8 1/2 in (1,435 mm)
- Length: 68'
- Width: 10' 5 5/8"
- Height: 14' 9" (DC pantograph), 12' 8 3/8" (cab)
- Electric system/s: 11 kV 25 Hz AC Catenary; 11 kV 60 Hz AC Catenary; 660 V DC Third rail
- Traction motors: 6 × GE Model 752
- Transmission: 11 kV 25 Hz and 11 kV 60 Hz fed through a tap changer supplying 12 Mercury arc Ignitron tube rectifiers or 660 V Resistance controlled DC current providing power to 6 DC traction motors.
Performance figures
- Maximum speed: 90 mph
- Power output: 4,000 hp (2.98 MW)
- Tractive effort: Continuous: 34,000 lb (15,422 kg)
Career
- Operators: New Haven, Penn Central, Conrail
- Class: NH: EP-5; PC / CR: E40
- Numbers: New Haven 370–379; Penn Central 4970–4979 (NH 370, 372, 378, 379 never renumbered to PC)
- Nicknames: Jets
- Locale: Northeastern United States
- Last run: 1977
- Disposition: Scrapped

The New Haven EP-5 was a double-ended mercury arc rectifier electric locomotive built in 1955 by General Electric, for the New York, New Haven and Hartford Railroad. It was built to haul passenger trains between Grand Central Terminal or Penn Station in New York City and New Haven, Connecticut. The EP-5s resembled the Alco FA and even more resembled the Pennsylvania Railroad Class E2b.

The EP-5s were the first AC passenger electric locomotives to use rectifiers to convert alternating current from overhead wires to direct current for the traction motors. They also collected DC from the third rail used by the New York Central, whose tracks the New Haven used to reach Grand Central Terminal.

All of the class were equipped with the Pennsylvania Railroad's cab signal system needed to operate into Penn Station; Washington, D.C.-Boston through trains over the Hell Gate Bridge, plus the Montrealer/Washingtonian, were their main assignment throughout their New Haven careers.

The units were known as "Jets" due to the roaring sound made by their main blowers.

The EP-5s had a reputation for rapid acceleration and high pulling capacity. However, the class also had a tendency to overheat and catch fire due to the crowded, poorly ventilated internal component arrangement, a situation made necessary by the need for the units to conform to the weight restrictions imposed by the New York Central's Park Avenue steel viaduct. This problem was significantly aggravated by the New Haven management's de-emphasis of electric operations in favor of its new dual-power FL9 diesels, and the railroad's financial condition. By 1962, a year after the New Haven entered bankruptcy, only three units were in service. All 10 were quickly rebuilt under the trustees' management, but by the time of the New Haven's 1969 inclusion in Penn Central, four were again out of service (and were soon scrapped). The EP-5s were rapidly replaced on Washington–Boston trains by the reliable former Pennsylvania Railroad GG1 electrics.

When the New Haven was merged into PC, the six units still in service were redesignated as the E-40 class, and were assigned to commuter train service between Grand Central Terminal and New Haven. The E-40s continued in this service, steadily dwindling in number, until May 1973 when the Metropolitan Transportation Authority suddenly banned them after #4971 caught fire in the Park Avenue Tunnel May 29; all went into dead storage. Amtrak passed them up for new electrics. Two of the units, #4973 and #4977, were rebuilt by PC into freight units, stripped of their third-rail capability, steam generators, and one of the two pantographs. They were used in a variety of light-duty freight services, but their utility was limited by their lack of multiple-unit capability and dynamic brakes. Within a year of Penn Central's inclusion into Conrail, the remaining two E-40s were retired. All were scrapped by 1979.
