= NLTC =

NLTC may refer to:

- Netherlands Telugu Community
- No-load tap changer
