= Central Ohio Coal Company =

Subsidiary of CONSOL Energy

The Central Ohio Coal Company, once a subsidiary of American Electric Power, is now a subsidiary of CONSOL Energy. At one time, they owned and operated Big Muskie in the Cumberland, Ohio area. They were responsible for fueling the AEP Muskingum River Power Plant at Relief, Ohio.

From the 1960s to the late 1980s, the company employed nearly 1,000 people in southeastern Ohio, producing up to 1.7 million tons of coal annually. Today, it is still one of the major employers in Morgan County, Ohio, although its high-sulfur coal now spurs little demand. Many of the company's employees were members of the United Mine Workers.

10,000 acres (40 km2) of reclaimed land owned by the company was donated to form The Wilds.
