= Pennsylvania Railroad class E2c =

Pennsylvania Railroad E2c
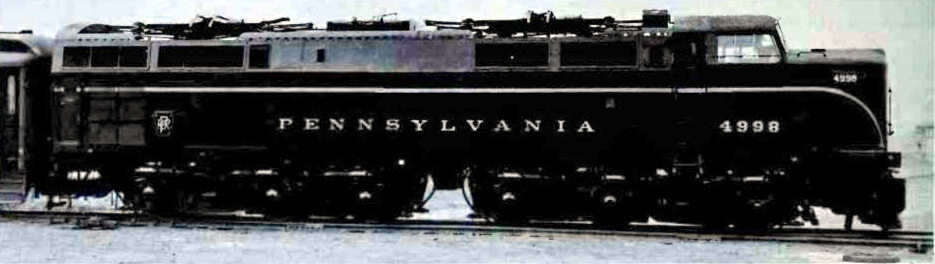
Type and origin
- Power type: Electric
- Builder: Westinghouse and Baldwin-Lima-Hamilton
- Serial number: BLH 75484, 75485
- Build date: February 1952
- Total produced: 2
Specifications
- Configuration
  - AAR: C-C
  - UIC: Co'Co'
- Gauge: 4 ft 8 1/2 in (1,435 mm) standard gauge
- Electric system/s: 11 kV, 25 Hz AC
- Current pickup(s): Pantograph
- Traction motors: Westinghouse 370 (6 off)
- Transmission: AC current fed via a transformer tap changer through 12 Ignitron (Mercury arc) rectifier tubes to DC traction motors
Performance figures
- Power output: 3,000 hp (2,200 kW)
Career
- Operators: Pennsylvania Railroad
- Class: E2c
- Numbers: 4997, 4998

Pennsylvania Railroad class E2c comprised a pair of experimental C-C (AAR) or Co-Co (UIC) electric locomotives. The bodywork and running gear was produced by Baldwin-Lima-Hamilton while the electrical equipment was provided by Westinghouse, who also acted as principal contractor.

In 1952 the Pennsylvania Railroad took delivery of eight experimental locomotives, four from General Electric and four from Westinghouse. While GE's were all of the same class (E2b), the Westinghouse locomotives were split into two classes. Two locomotives had three two-axle trucks (E3b).

The significant technical difference between the locomotives was that those from General Electric used traditional AC traction motors. Those by Westinghouse had mercury arc rectifiers to convert the AC traction power to DC. In consequence they were able to use ordinary DC traction motors, identical to those on contemporary diesel-electric locomotives.

The locomotives were scrapped in 1964. However, the rectifier principle they pioneered soon became the standard for new AC electric locomotives,
