= Pennsylvania Railroad class E3b =

Pennsylvania Railroad E3b class
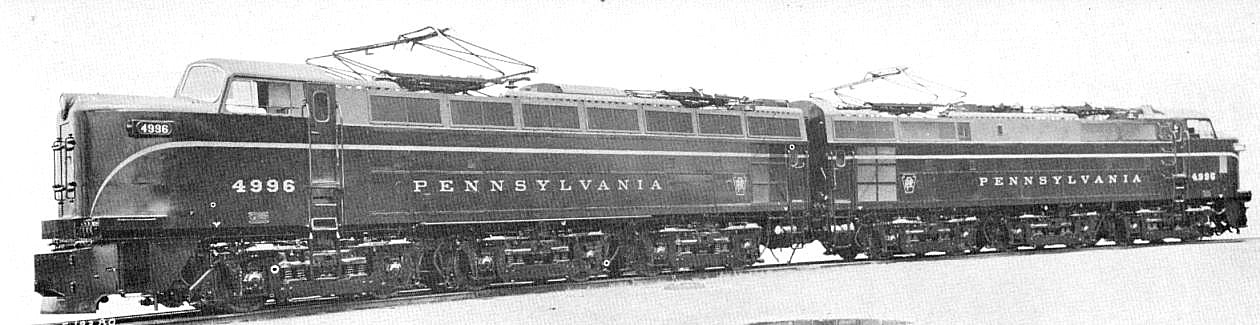
Type and origin
- Power type: Electric
- Builder: Baldwin-Lima-Hamilton
- Serial number: 75482, 75483
- Build date: November 1951
- Total produced: 2
Specifications
- Configuration
  - AAR: B-B-B
  - UIC: Bo'Bo'Bo'
- Gauge: 4 ft 8 1/2 in (1,435 mm) standard gauge
- Loco weight: 378,000 lb (171,000 kg)
- Electric system/s: 11 kV, 25 Hz AC
- Current pickup(s): Pantograph (2 off)
- Traction motors: Westinghouse 370 (6 off)
- Transmission: AC fed via a transformer tap changer through 12 Ignitron (Mercury arc) rectifier to DC traction motors.
Performance figures
- Maximum speed: 63 mph (101 km/h)
- Power output: 3,000 hp (2,200 kW)
Career
- Operators: Pennsylvania Railroad
- Class: E3b
- Numbers: 4995, 4996
- Scrapped: 1964

Pennsylvania Railroad class E3b was an experimental electric locomotive supplied by Westinghouse Electric & Manufacturing Co. The locomotive was of the two unit design, with each unit having a B-B-B (AAR) or Bo-Bo-Bo (UIC) wheel arrangement. The bodywork and running gear was produced by Baldwin-Lima-Hamilton while the electrical equipment was provided by Westinghouse, who also acted as the main contractor.

In 1952 and 1953 the Pennsylvania Railroad took delivery of ten experimental locomotives, six from General Electric and four from Westinghouse. While GE's were all of the same class (E2b), the Westinghouse locomotives were split into two classes. Two locomotives had two three-axle trucks (E2c), while the other two had three two-axle trucks (E3b).

The locomotives were scrapped in 1964.
