= Netherlands Telugu Community =

Non-profit organisation in the Netherlands

NLTC
- Named after: Netherlands Telugu Community
- Founded: 2017
- Founded at: Amstelveen, Netherlands
- Type: non-profit organisation
- Purpose: ""
- Headquarters: Netherlands
- Region served: Netherlands
- Members: 22
- CEO: Venkata Raju Vijjapu
- Volunteers: 22
- Website: nltelugucommunity.org
- "Engage-Connect-Thrive"

Netherlands Telugu Community (NLTC) is a non-profit organisation founded in The Netherlands.

During the Covid-19 lockdown NLTC actively connected people with the Indian Embassy and requested the Indian government to arrange a flight from Amsterdam to Hyderabad.

== Cultural events ==
NLTC organizes various cultural events for the community.

== Community work ==
NLTC actively participates in charity related activities in the Netherlands and India. Every year NLTC organizes a charity run to collect funds to support KWF in fighting cancer. NLTC also works with other local organizations in the Netherlands in charity related activities.

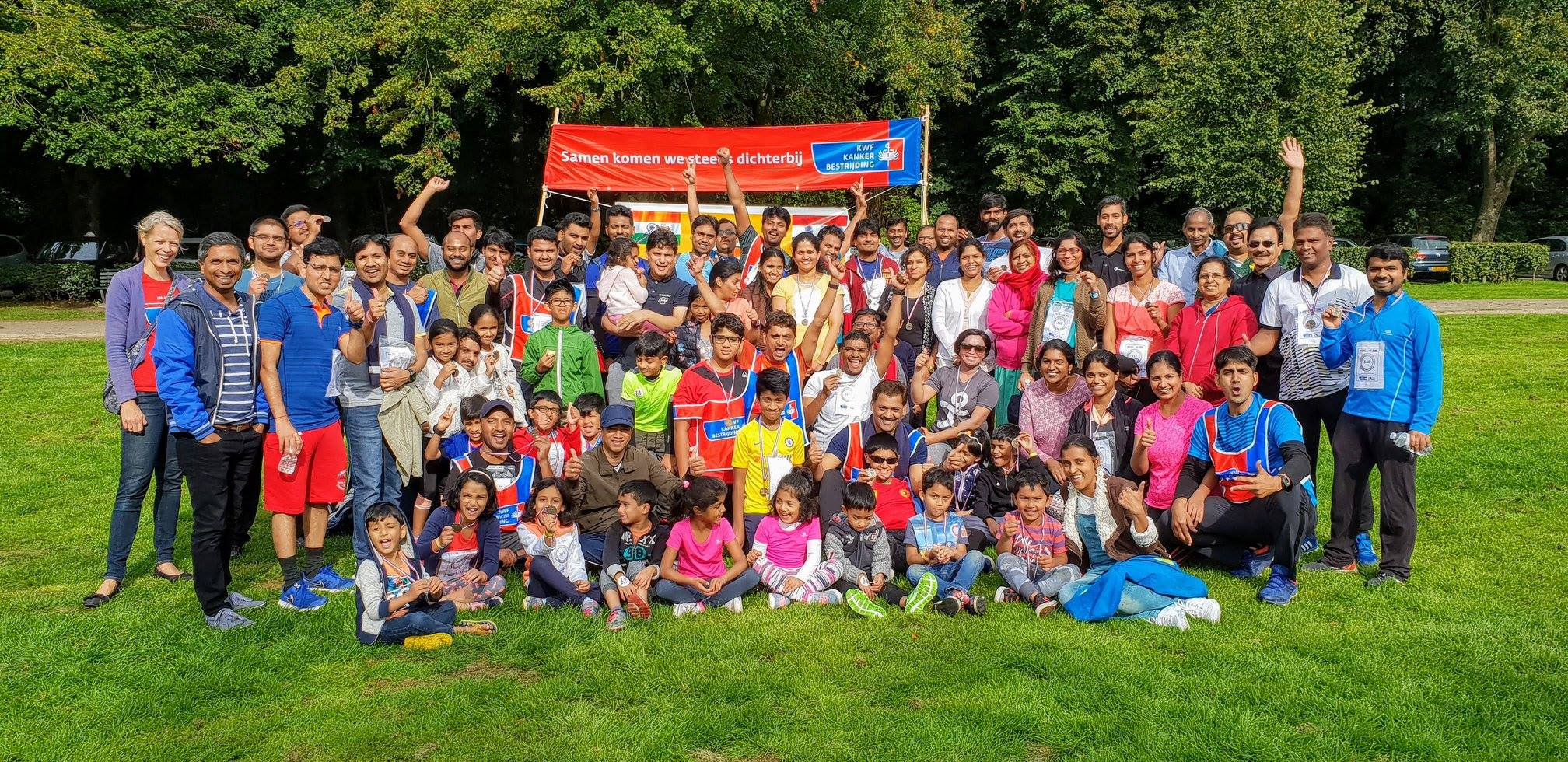
NLTC organized "Run for Charity" event supporting KWF in finding cure for Cancer
