= The Wilds (Ohio) =

Safari park and conservation center in Ohio, United States

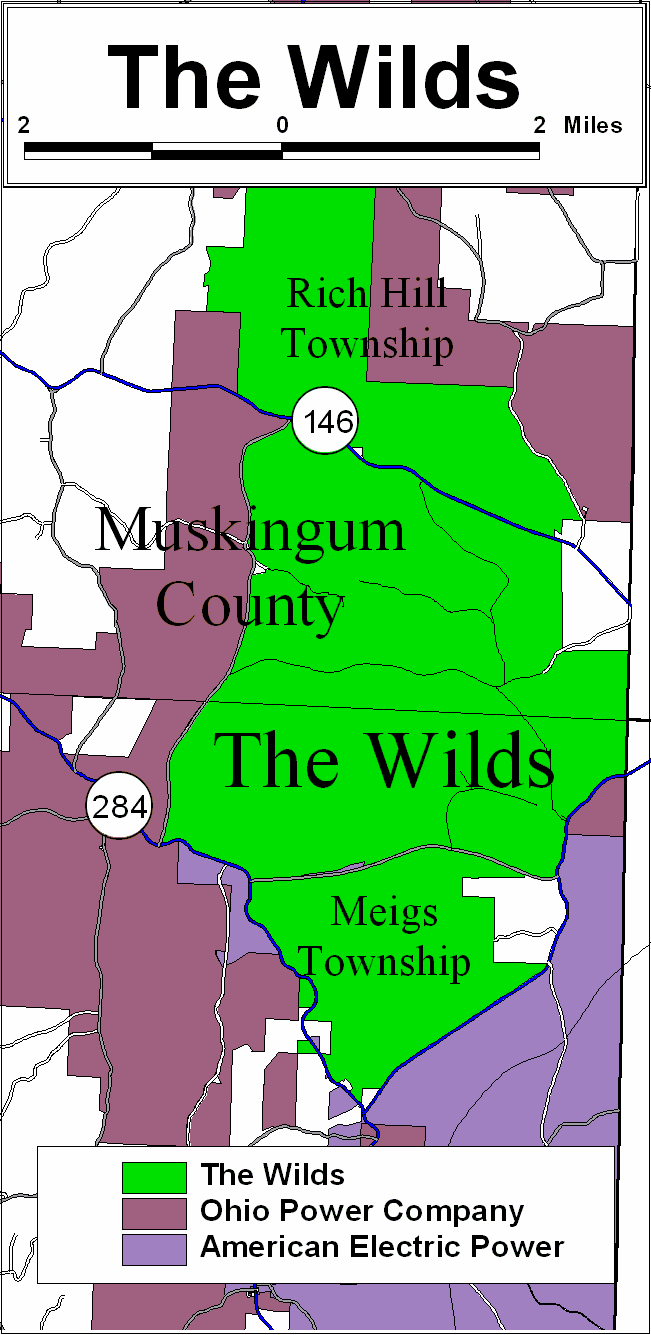
- Interactive map of The Wilds
- 39°49′46″N 81°43′58″W
- Date opened: 1994
- Location: Cumberland, Ohio, United States
- Land area: 37 km^{2} (14 sq mi)
- No. of animals: >600
- No. of species: <25
- Annual visitors: 100,000+
- Memberships: Association of Zoos and Aquariums; World Association of Zoos and Aquariums
- Director: Joe Greathouse (Vice President of The Wilds)
- Website: www.thewilds.org

The Wilds is a private, non-profit safari park and conservation center located in southeastern Muskingum County, Ohio, just west of Cumberland, under the authority of the Columbus Zoo. The park combines conservation science and education programs, and also offers visitors leisure activities such as ziplining, horseback riding (cancelled 2026, by seasons end) fishing, Recreational and primitive camping (at Hellbender Campground.). The property encompasses 37.04 km^{2} (14.30 sq mi) of reclaimed coal mine land and includes 8.1 km^{2} (3.1 sq mi) of pastures and a 27-acre (11 ha) Carnivore Conservation Center. The Wilds is designated an Audubon Important Bird Area so the property includes a birding station with covered lookout as well as a butterfly habitat with hiking trails, more than 15 miles (24 km) of mountain bike and hiking trails and approximately 150 lakes.

== History ==
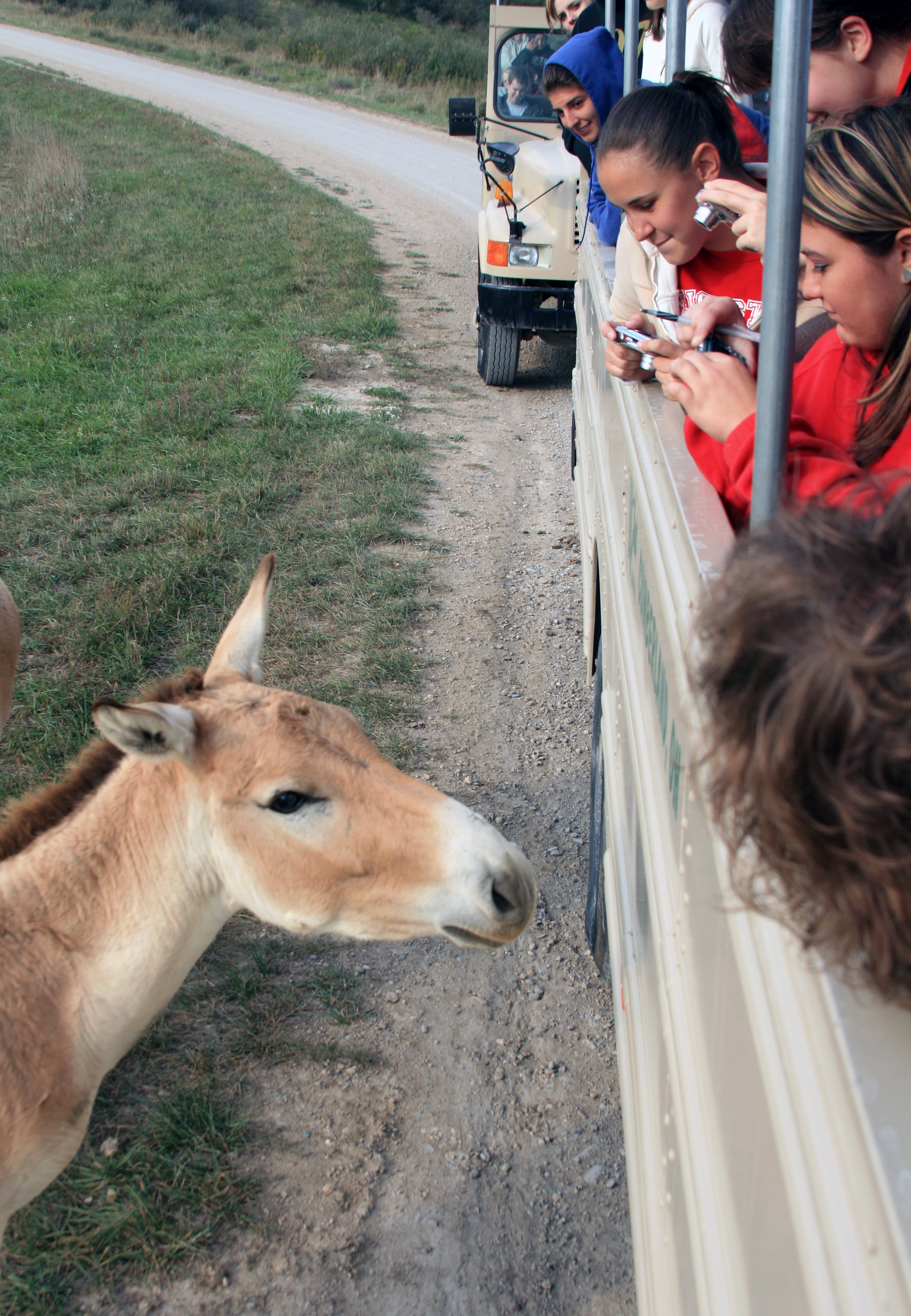
Onager approaching a tour bus

In 1984, the Wilds was incorporated as a 501(c)(3) non-profit under the name The International Center for the Preservation of Wild Animals, Inc. (ICPWA), formalizing a public-private partnership involving the Ohio Departments of Natural Resources and Development, the Ohio Zoos and the private sector that formed in the late-1970s. That same year, the Wilds was gifted its current 9,154 acres (3,704 ha; 14.303 sq mi) from the Central Ohio Coal Company. With a location secured, the Wilds began hiring employees, planning development, and organizing fundraising support.

In 1989, the Johnson Visitor Center was completed, built with the environment in mind using a state-of-the-art geothermal heating and cooling system. In 1990, the first animal management facilities and fencing of the initial open range began. These projects allowed for the Wilds to receive its first animals, Przewalski's horses in 1992.

The Wilds officially opened to the public for tours in 1994. For the next few years, it continued to add animals, improve and expand conservation efforts, and increase public awareness. In 2001, the Wilds began its partnership with the Columbus Zoo and Aquarium. This culminated in the completion of the first Strategic Vision Plan in 2005, designed to guide the success and future development of the Wilds for the future. Jack Hanna, conservationist, ecologist, and Zoo icon, was instrumental in the formation of The Wilds.

== Strategic plan ==
In 2005, the Wilds initiated its long-term strategic plan, which is broken into "strategic centers" to facilitate progress in each field. These "centers" are based on the Wilds' core values, which include a commitment and respect for nature, social and scientific relevance, and innovative, entrepreneurial and creative approaches to the problem at hand. The strategic centers are focused on animal management, science and research, conservation education & professional training, land stewardship and habitat management, personal experience, institutional partnerships, and resource development & sustainability.

== Conservation ==
The Wilds is involved in many different conservation methods in an attempt to help reduce the decline of wildlife habitats. These methods range from professional training to animal husbandry to conservation medicine.

In order to help the development of conservation medicine, The Wilds has started three projects they hope will be models for the conservation medicine initiative as a whole. These include assessing water quality and its effects on marine life, comparing animal health parameters in multiple habitats, and evaluating fresh water mussels for diseases, parasites and toxins. Each of these projects is designed to assess the condition of various wildlife and their habitats, and to develop methods to reduce or reverse the destruction of each ecosystem.

== Gallery ==
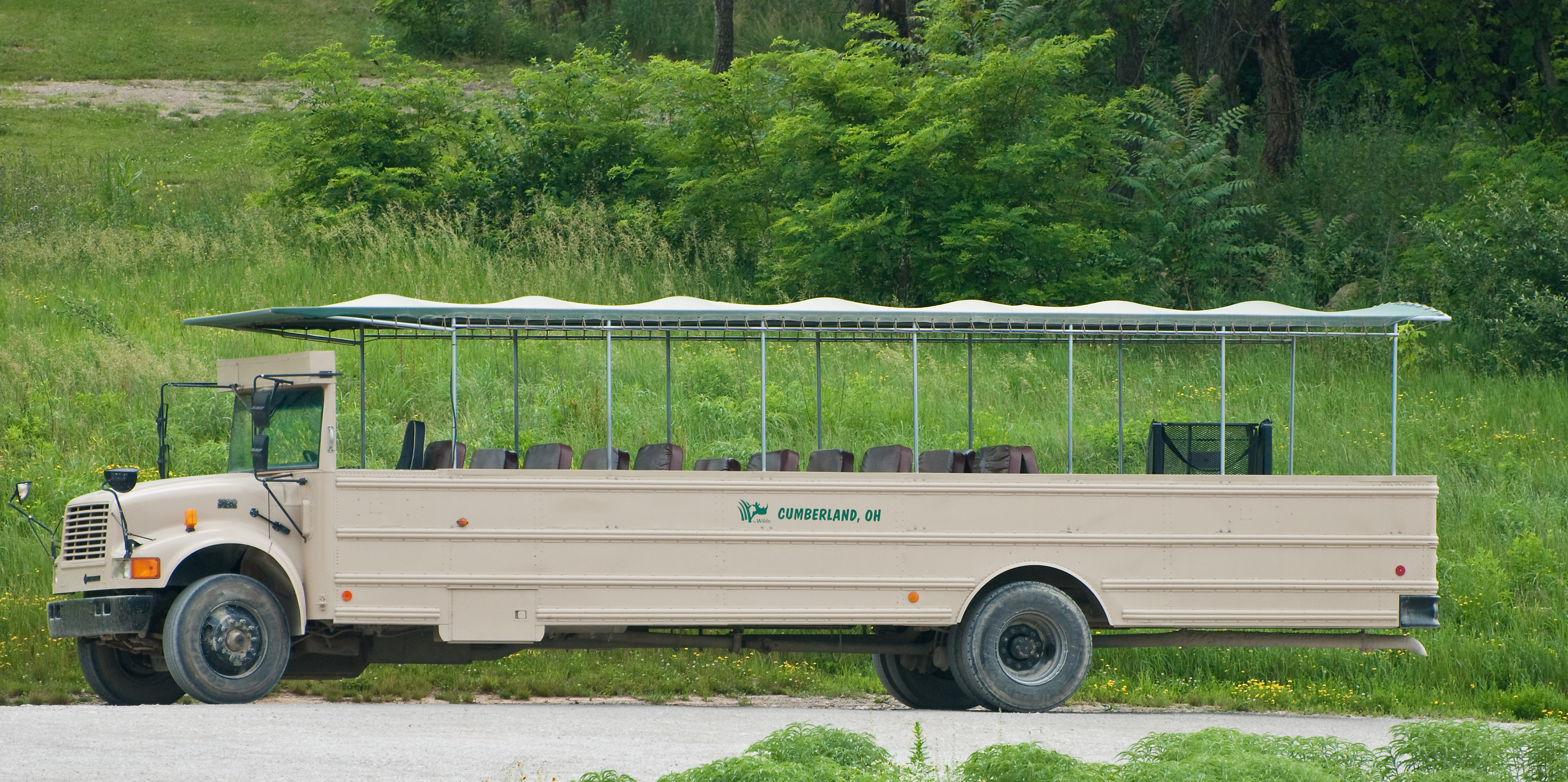
Open-air safari tour vehicle.

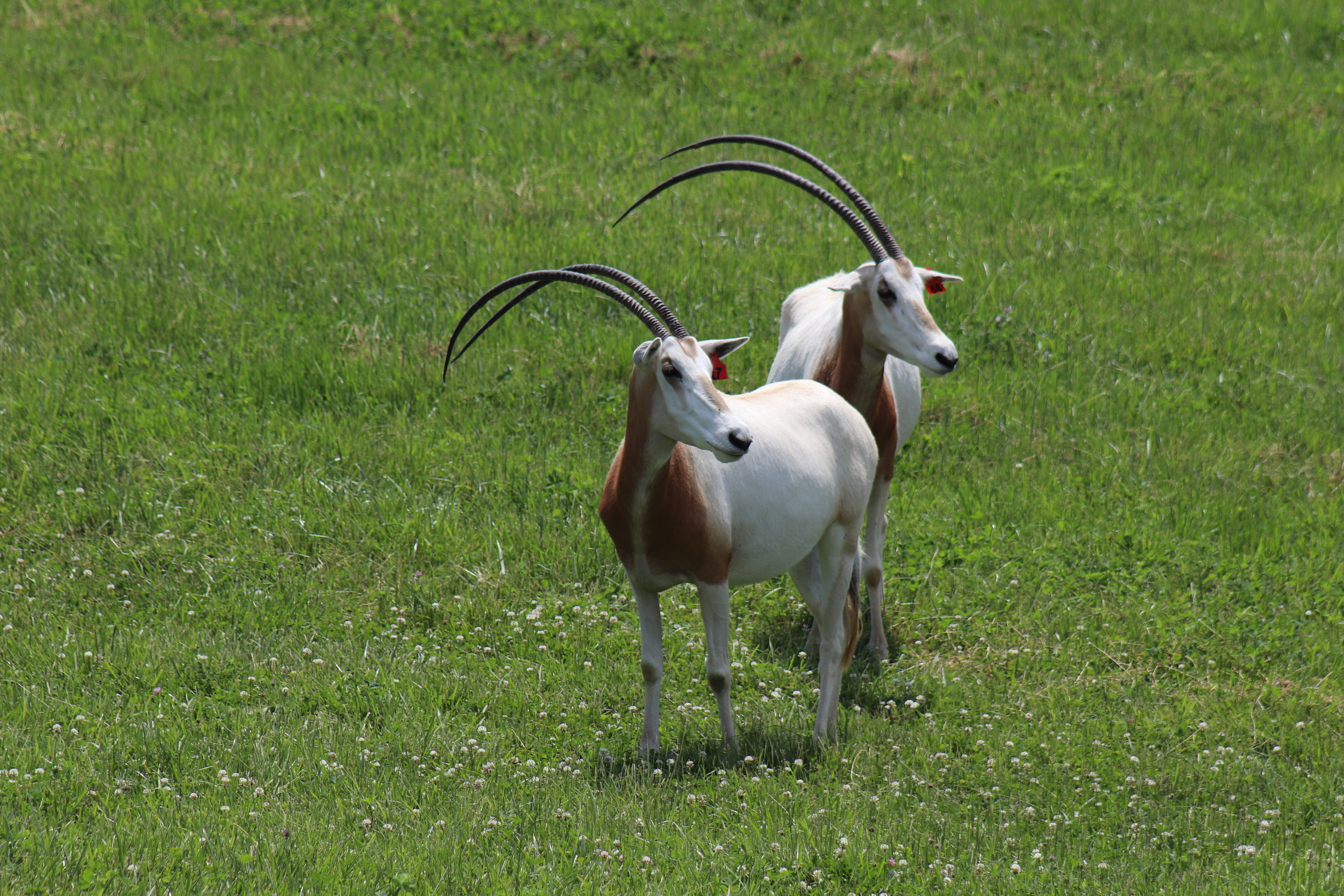
A pair of endangered scimitar oryx (Oryx dammah).

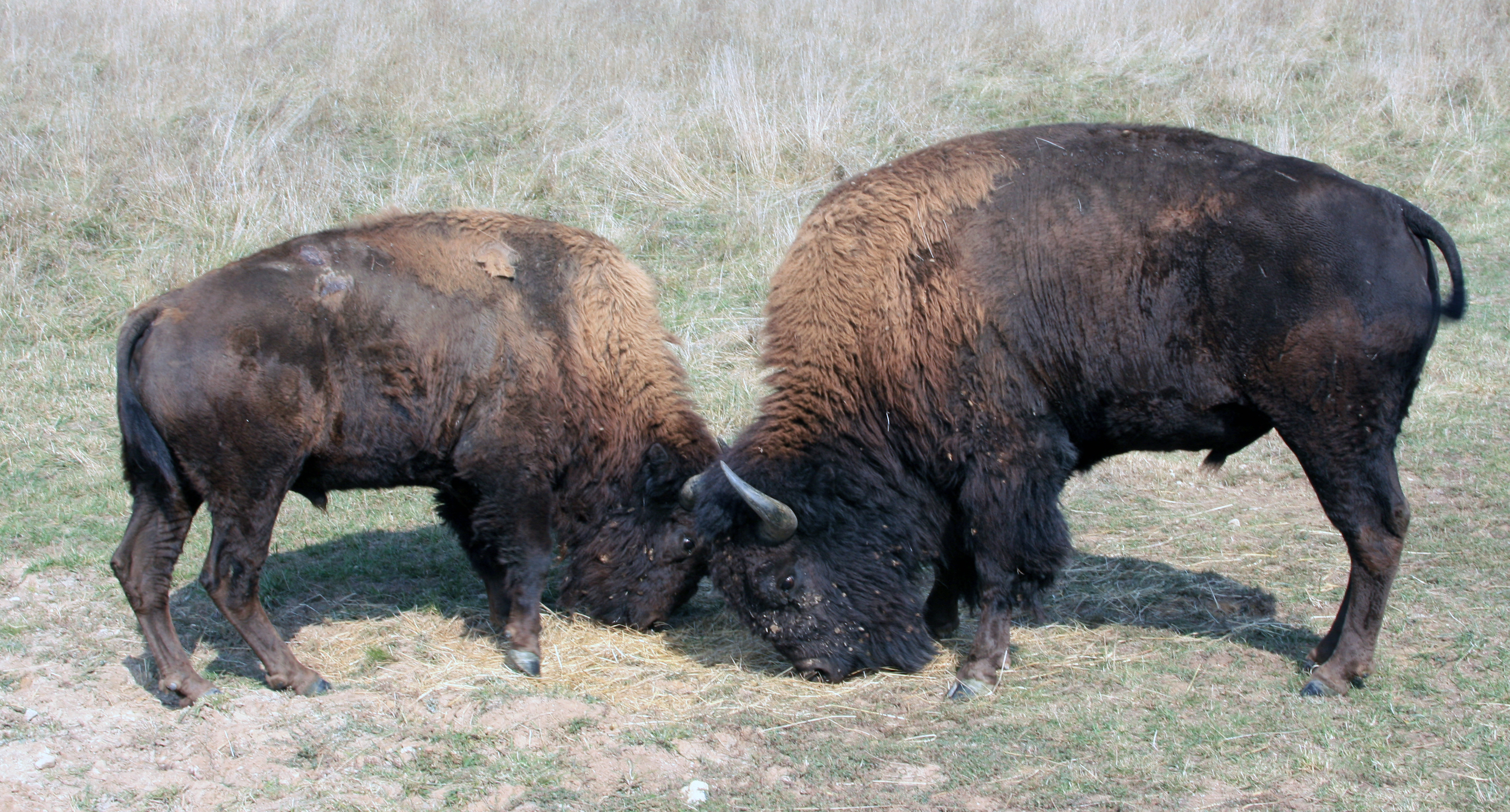
American bison (Bison bison) (p (Plains bison) feeding in the park.

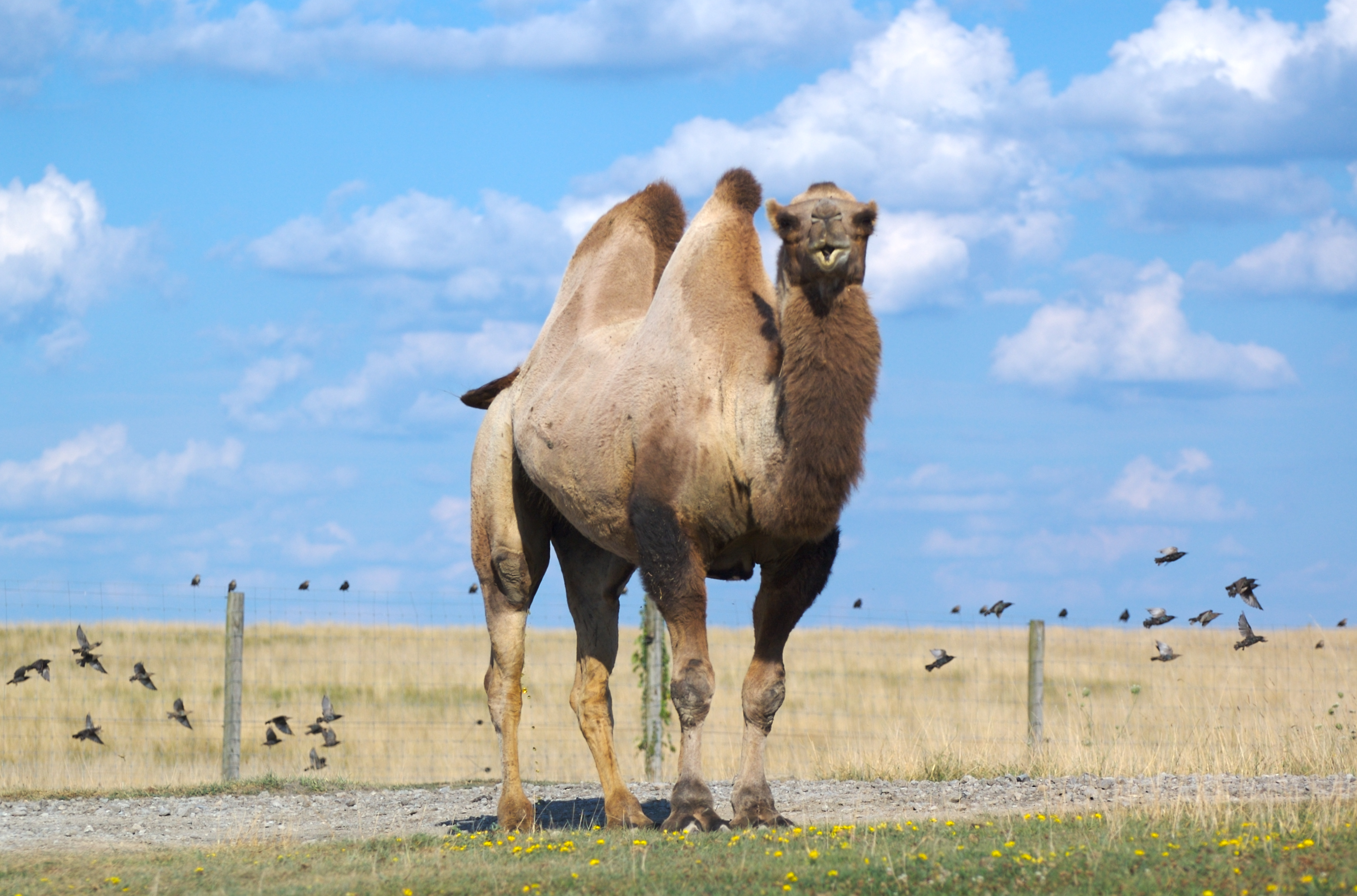
Bactrian camel (Camelus bactrianus).

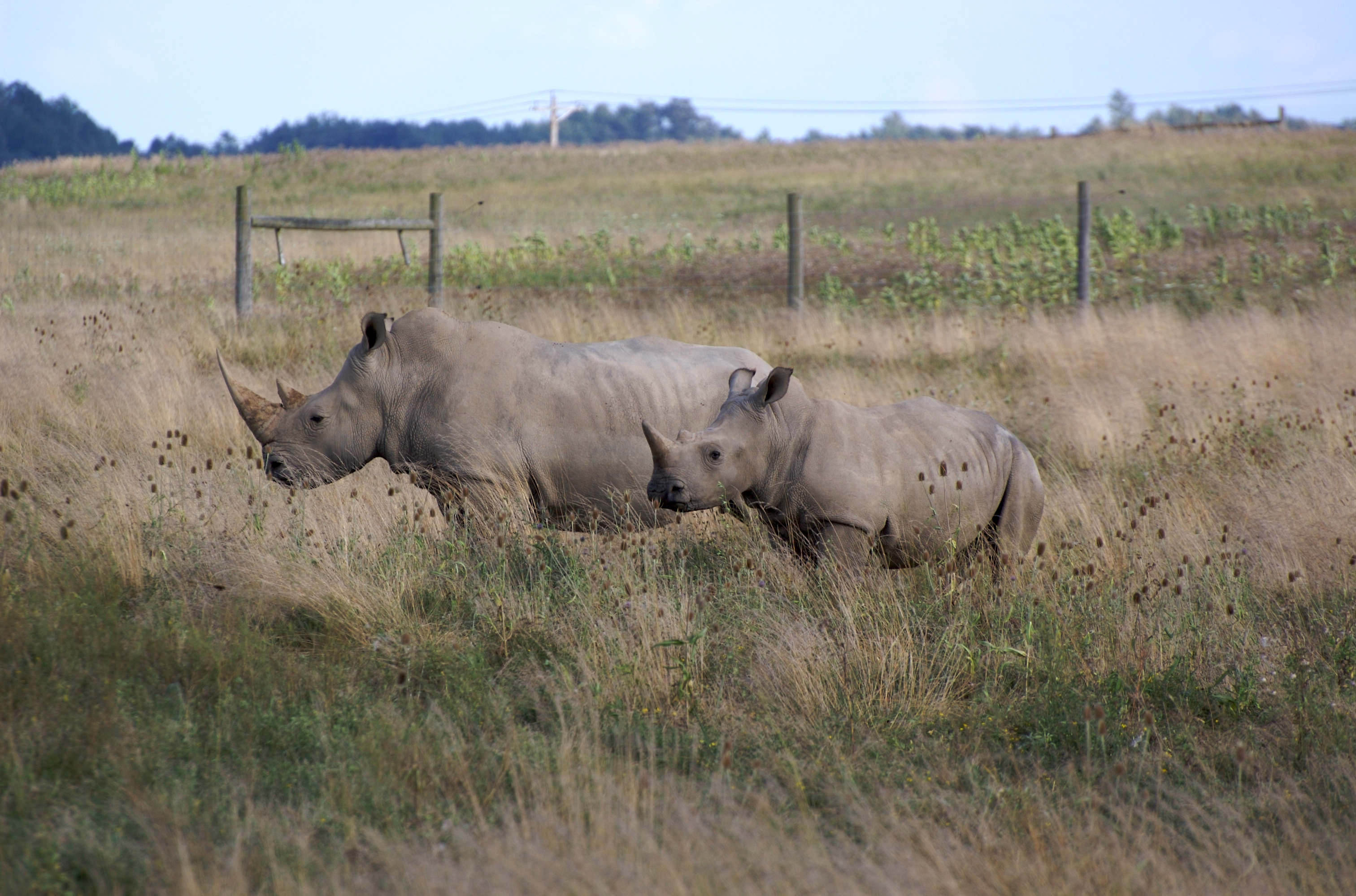
Southern white rhinoceros (Ceratotherium simum simum).

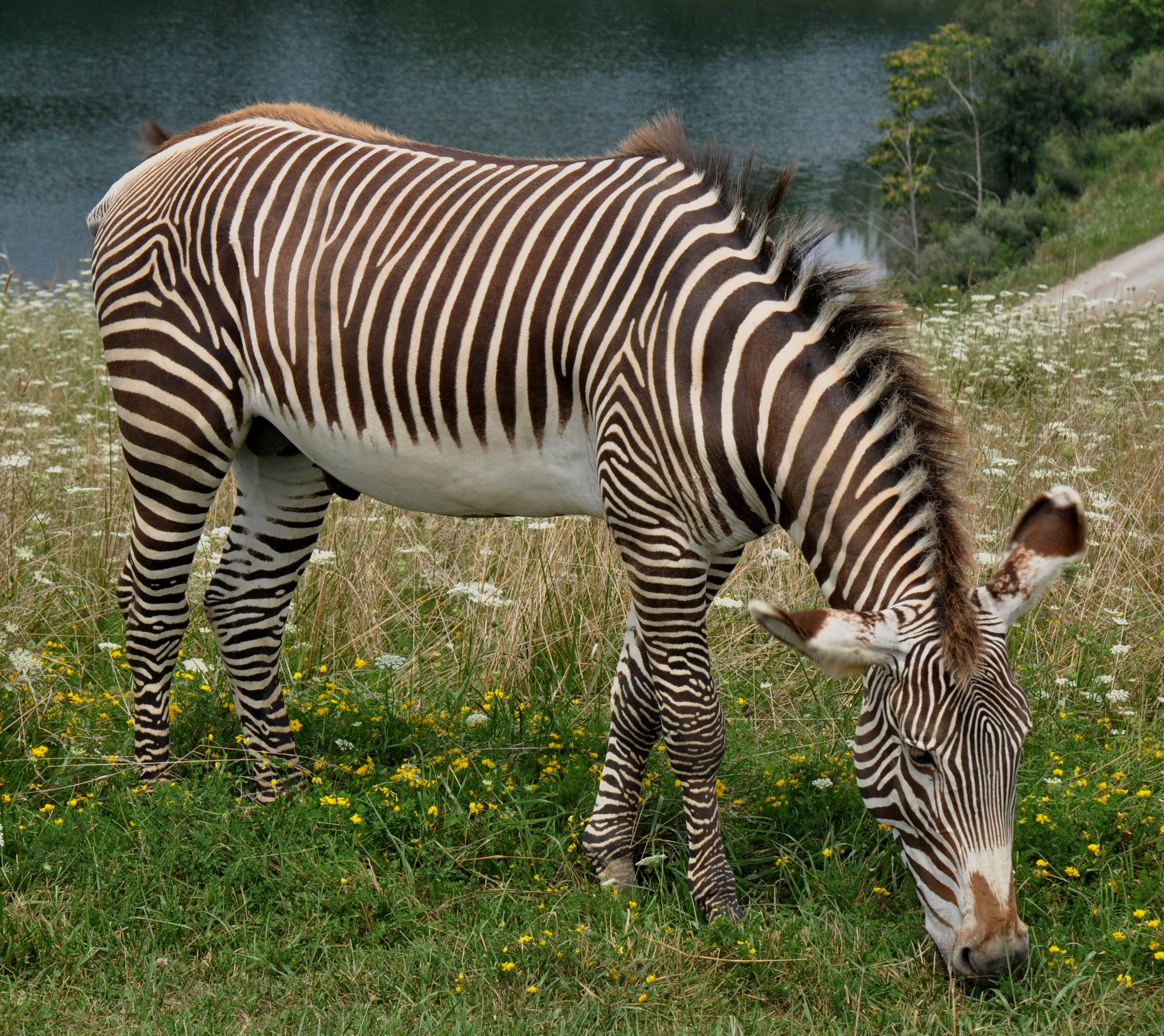
Grévy's zebra (Equus grevyi) grazing.

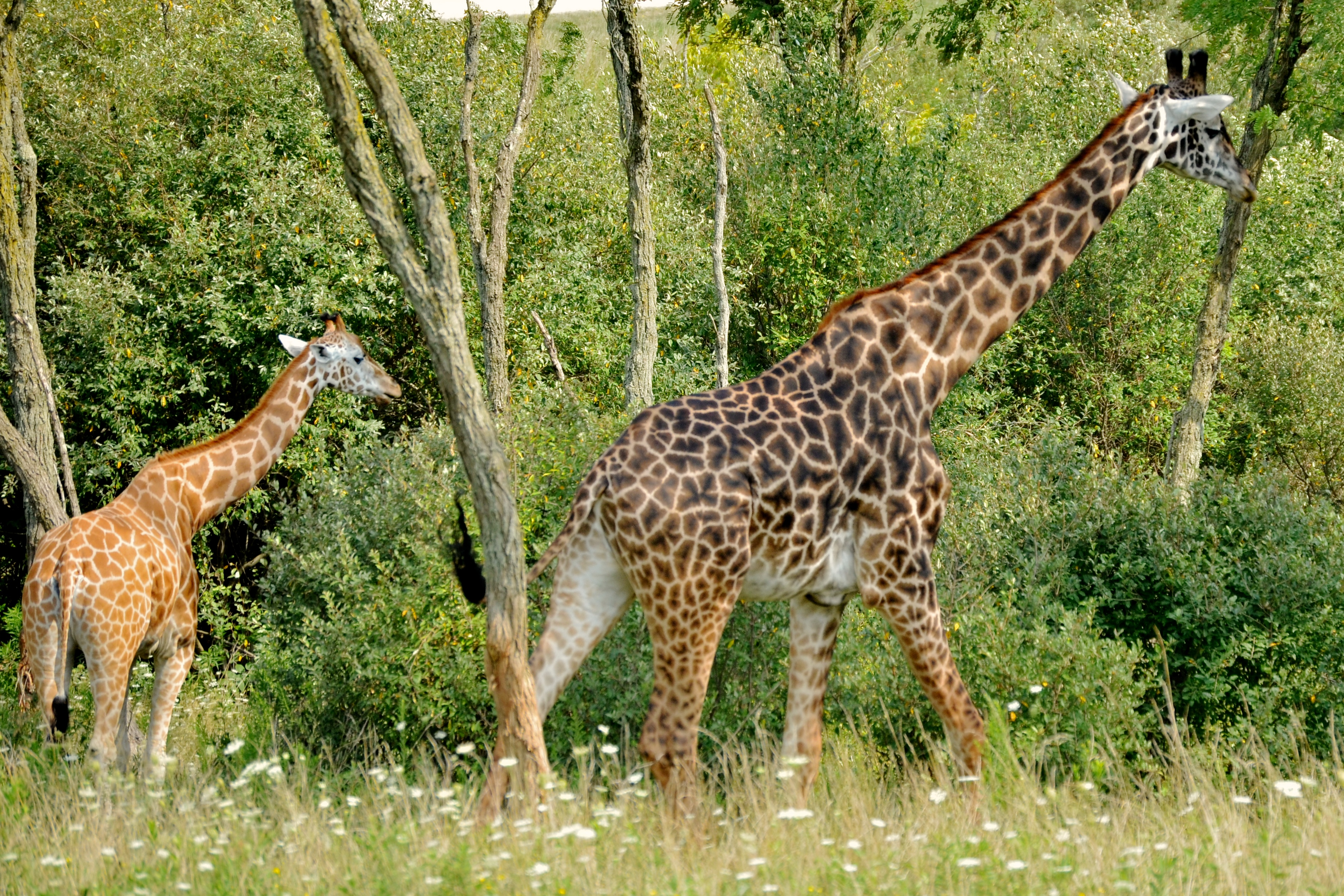
Masai giraffe (Giraffa tippelskirchi).

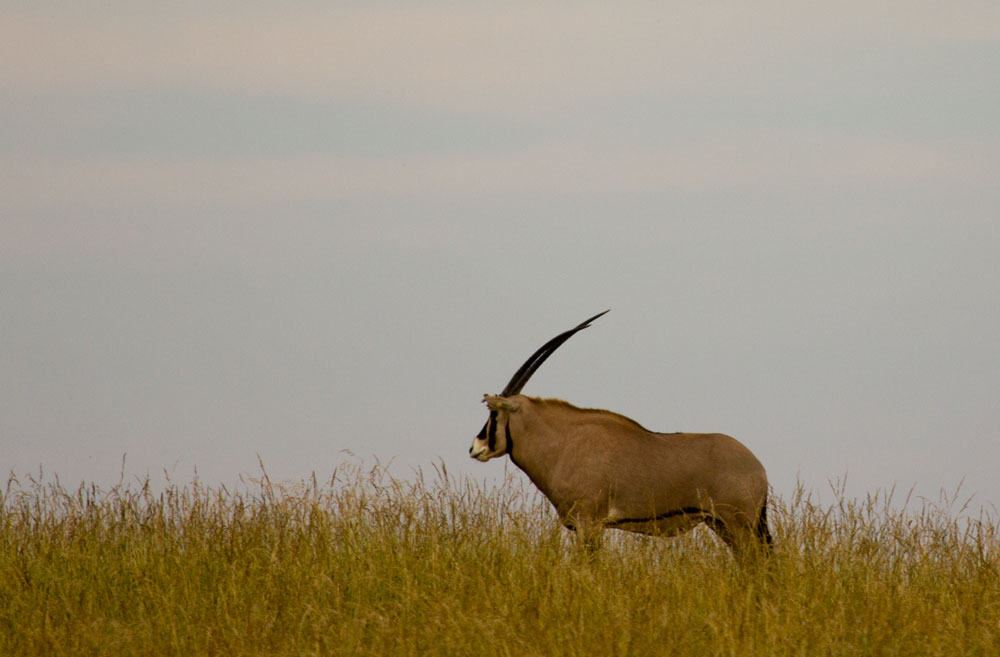
Fringe-eared oryx (Oryx beisa callotis) at sunset.
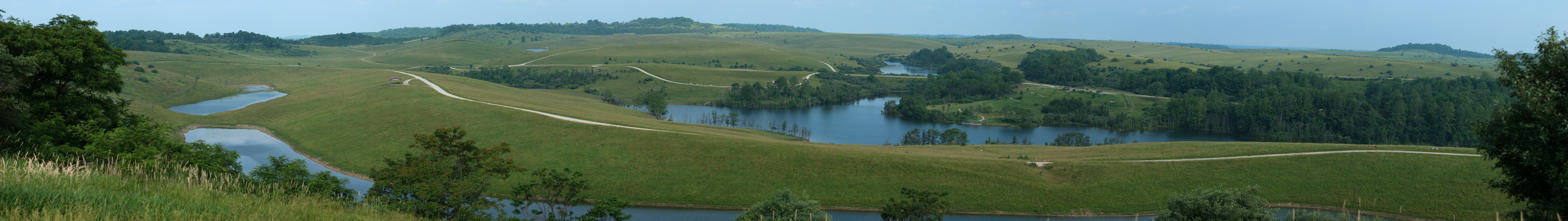
Panorama of The Wilds, from the Johnson Visitor Center overlook.
