= Pennsylvania Railroad class E2b =

Pennsylvania Railroad E2b
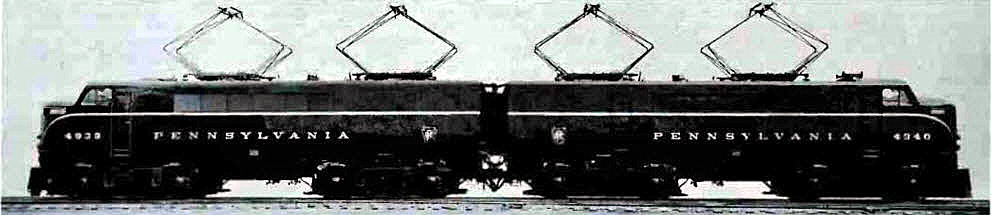
Type and origin
- Power type: Electric
- Builder: General Electric
- Build date: 1952
- Total produced: 6
Specifications
- Configuration
  - AAR: B-B
  - UIC: Bo'Bo'
- Gauge: 4 ft 8 1/2 in (1,435 mm) standard gauge
- Electric system/s: 11 kV, 25 Hz AC
- Current pickup: Pantograph
- Transmission: AC current fed via transformer tap changers to AC traction motors.
Performance figures
- Maximum speed: 65 mph (105 km/h)
- Power output: 2,500 hp (1,900 kW)
- Tractive effort: 35,400 lbf (157 kN)
Career
- Operators: Pennsylvania Railroad
- Class: E2b
- Numbers: 4939–4944
- Scrapped: 1964

Pennsylvania Railroad class E2b comprised six experimental B-B electric locomotives built for the railroad by General Electric.

In 1952 the Pennsylvania Railroad took delivery of eight experimental locomotives:

- 4 locomotives of the class E2b with the road numbers #4939–#4942 built by General Electric
- 2 locomotives of the class E2c with the road numbers #4995 and #4996 built by Baldwin-Lima-Hamilton & Westinghouse
- 2 locomotives of the class E3b the road numbers #4997 and #4998 built by Baldwin-Lima-Hamilton & Westinghouse

GE built two demonstrators to show the Great Northern Railway. These two were sold to the PRR in March 1953 and numbered #4943–#4944.

The class E2b locomotives were commonly used in three pairs. Like most previous PRR electric locomotives, they were straight AC-powered, and did not use rectifiers. Because of this, they could work in multiple with existing PRR locomotives, and generally did so with class P5a.

The locomotives were scrapped in 1964.
