= Muskingum River Power Plant =

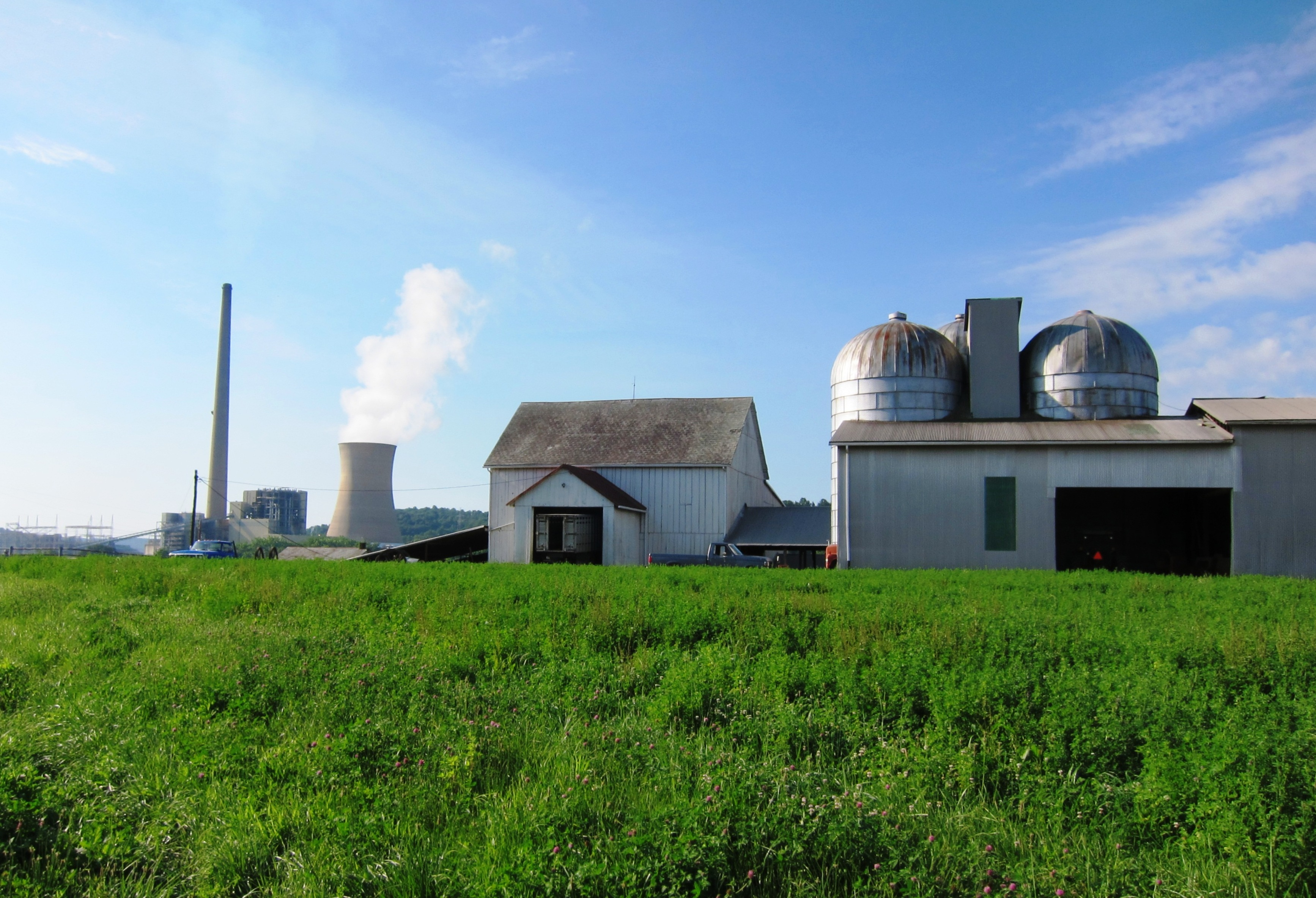
- Unit 5 of Muskingum River Power Plant in the background in 2010
- Country: United States
- Location: Waterford Township, Washington County, near Beverly, Ohio
- Coordinates: 39°35′18″N 81°40′57″W
- Status: Demolished
- Commission date: Unit 1: December 1953; Unit 2: June 1954; Unit 3: December 1957; Unit 4: May 1958; Unit 5: October 1968
- Decommission date: Units 1–4: December 2014; Unit 5: May 2015
- Owner: American Electric Power (AEP)
- Operator: American Electric Power (AEP)

Thermal power station
- Primary fuel: Bituminous coal
- Turbine technology: Steam turbine
- Cooling source: Units 1–4: Muskingum River; Unit 5: cooling tower

Power generation
- Nameplate capacity: 1,529 MW

Muskingum River Power Plant was a 1.5-gigawatt (1,529 MW) coal power plant, owned and operated by American Electric Power (AEP). It was located on the west bank of Muskingum River, about 4 miles (6 km) northwest of the town of Beverly, Ohio in Washington County, Ohio. At its peak, the plant powered three million households. The plant operated from 1953 until ceasing generation in 2015.

== Units ==
Four out of five plant's units were among the oldest in the United States:

Unit	Nameplate capacity (MWe)	Commissioned	Decommissioned	Notes
1	219.6	1953	2014	
2	219.6	1954	2014	
3	237.5	1957	2014	
4	237.5	1958	2014	
5	615.2	1968	2015	Supercritical unit, used closed-loop water cooling via a cooling tower

Units 1–4 discharged their waste heat (about twice their combined electrical output) into Muskingum River.

== Closure and demolition ==
As a cost-cutting measure, AEP idled one of the units at Muskingum River in 2010.

Originally slated to be converted to run on natural gas, Muskingum River closed entirely due to environmental regulations and market conditions at a cost of $150 million to $170 million. Ohio's power consumption was noted as being "flat." The original proposal called for Units 1–4 to be shuttered by December 31, 2014, and Unit 5 to be converted to natural gas. Unit 5 closed on May 31, 2015, with 150 workers laid off.

AEP sold the site to Commercial Liability Partners in September 2015 to repurpose the brownfields for future redevelopment. Adamo was contracted to demolish the Muskingum River. Demolition was completed in June 2018 following the implosion of the plant's remaining two smokestacks. In January 2021, the site was sold to the Southeastern Ohio Port Authority, who is continuing the repurposing and redevelopment process.

== Accidents and incidents ==
=== Hydrogen explosion ===
On January 8, 2007, a hydrogen supply truck was making its routine weekly delivery of dihydrogen (H_{2}) gas to the station's hydrogen system, when an explosion occurred at 9:20 a.m. The truck driver was killed in the accident, and ten other people were injured. Premature failure of the pressure—relief device's rupture disc was blamed.

Two civil trials in 2011, however, essentially rejected AEP's claims that rupture discs and a third party contractor were to blame. The juries determined that AEP had acted with "deliberate intent" toward its own employee, Drumand McLaughlin, and with "conscious disregard" for the rights of the truck driver, Lewis Timmons, who was killed. A total of almost $13 million was assessed in damages as of August 29, 2011, including punitive damages to punish AEP subsidiaries Ohio Power Company and American Electric Power Service Corporation for their misconduct in failing to maintain the hydrogen systems. The companies were also to be assessed attorney's fees.

=== Demolition accident ===
On December 2, 2015, during the dismantling of a conveyor belt over a waterway, the housing for the belt line failed. One worker was killed and another was injured. Occupational Safety and Health Administration (OSHA) cited Adamo on four serious violations.

== See also ==
- List of power stations in Ohio
