= Relief, Ohio =

Unincorporated community in Ohio, U.S.

Coordinates: 39°35′20″N 81°41′18″W

Relief is an unincorporated community in Washington County, in the U.S. state of Ohio.

== History ==
A post office called Relief was established in 1889, and remained in operation until 1924. The community was so named from the "relief" residents expressed when their post office opened.
