= Tap changer =

Mechanism to change turn ratios in transformers

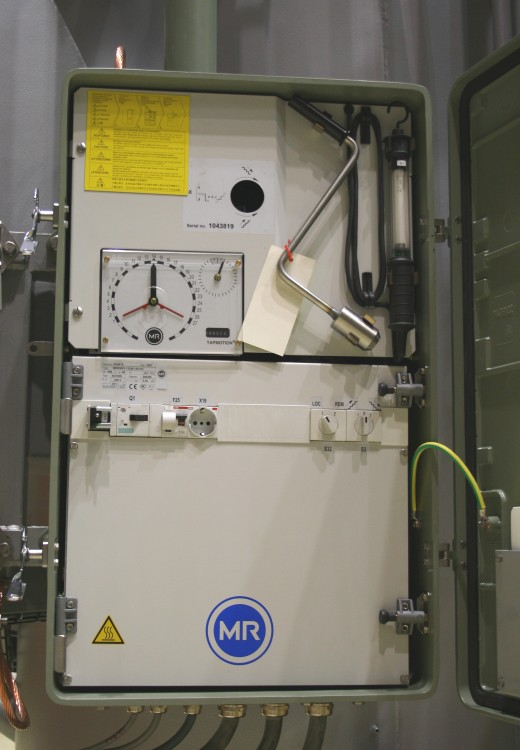
Motor drive unit of a on-load tap-changer.

A tap changer is a mechanism in transformers that allows for variable turn ratios to be selected in distinct steps. This is done by connecting to a number of access points, known as taps along either the primary or secondary windings.

Tap changers exist in two primary types, no-load tap changers (NLTC), which must be de-energized before the turn ratio is adjusted, and on-load tap changers (OLTC), which may adjust their turn ratio during operation. The tap selection on any tap changer may be made via an automatic system, as is often the case for OLTC, or a manual tap changer, which is more common for NLTC. Automatic tap changers can be placed on a lower or higher voltage winding, but for high-power generation and transmission applications, automatic tap changers are often placed on the higher voltage (lower current) transformer winding for easy access and to minimize the current load during operation.

== Tap changing ==
=== No-load tap changer ===
No-load tap changer (NLTC), also known as Off-circuit tap changer (OCTC) or De-energized tap changer (DETC), is a tap changer utilized in situations in which a transformer's turn ratio does not require frequent changing and it is permissible to de-energize the transformer system. This type of transformer is frequently employed in low power- low voltage transformers in which the tap point often may take the form of a transformer connection terminal, requiring the input line to be disconnected by hand and connected to the new terminal. Alternatively, in some systems, the process of tap changing may be assisted using a rotary or slider switch.

No-load tap changers are also employed in high-voltage distribution-type transformers in which the system includes a no-load tap changer on the primary winding to accommodate transmission system variations within a narrow band around the nominal rating. In such systems, the tap changer will often be set just once, at the time of installation, although it may be changed later to accommodate a long-term change in the system voltage profile.

=== On-load tap changer ===
On-load tap changer (OLTC), also known as On-circuit tap changer (OCTC), is a tap changer in applications where a supply interruption during a tap change is unacceptable, the transformer is often fitted with a more expensive and complex on-load tap changing mechanism. On-load tap changers may be generally classified as either mechanical, electronically assisted, or fully electronic.

These systems usually possess 33 taps (one at center "Rated" tap and sixteen to increase and decrease the turn ratio) and allow for ±10% variation (each step providing 0.625% variation) from the nominal transformer rating which, in turn, allows for stepped voltage regulation of the output.

A mechanical On load tap changer (OLTC), also known as under-load tap changer (ULTC) design, changing back and forth between tap positions 2 and 3

Tap changers typically use numerous tap selector switches which may not be switched under load, broken into even and odd banks, and switch between the banks with a heavy-duty diverter switch which can switch between them under load. The result operates like a dual-clutch transmission, with the tap selector switches taking the place of the gearbox and the diverter switch taking the place of the clutch.

=== Mechanical tap changers ===
A mechanical tap changer physically makes the new connection before releasing the old using multiple tap selector switches but avoids creating high circulating currents by using a diverter switch to temporarily place a large diverter impedance in series with the short-circuited turns. This technique overcomes the problems with open or short circuit taps. In a resistance type tap changer, the changeover must be made rapidly to avoid overheating of the diverter. A reactance type tap changer uses a dedicated preventive autotransformer winding to function as the diverter impedance, and a reactance type tap changer is usually designed to sustain off-tap loading indefinitely.

In a typical diverter switch, powerful springs are tensioned by a low power motor (motor drive unit, MDU), and then rapidly released to effect the tap changing operation. To reduce arcing at the contacts, the tap changer operates in a chamber filled with insulating transformer oil, or inside a vessel filled with pressurized SF_{6} gas. Reactance-type tap changers, when operating in oil, must allow for the additional inductive transients generated by the autotransformer and commonly include a vacuum bottle contact in parallel with the diverter switch. During a tap change operation, the potential rapidly increases between the two electrodes in the bottle, and some of the energy is dissipated in an arc discharge through the bottle instead of flashing across the diverter switch contacts.

Some arcing is unavoidable, and both the tap changer oil and the switch contacts will slowly deteriorate with use. To prevent contamination of the tank oil and facilitate maintenance operations, the diverter switch usually operates in a separate compartment from the main transformer tank, and often the tap selector switches will be located in the compartment as well. All of the winding taps will then be routed into the tap changer compartment through a terminal array.

One possible design (flag type) of on load mechanical tap changer is shown in the diagram. It commences operation at tap position 2, with load supplied directly via the connection on the right. Diverter resistor A is short-circuited; diverter B is unused. In moving to tap 3, the following sequence occurs:

1. Switch 3 closes, an off-load operation.
2. Rotary switch turns, breaking one connection and supplying load current through diverter resistor A.
3. Rotary switch continues to turn, connecting between contacts A and B. Load now supplied via diverter resistors A and B, winding turns bridged via A and B.
4. Rotary switch continues to turn, breaking contact with diverter A. Load now supplied via diverter B alone, winding turns no longer bridged.
5. Rotary switch continues to turn, shorting diverter B. Load now supplied directly via left hand connection. Diverter A is unused.
6. Switch 2 opens, an off-load operation.

The sequence is then carried out in reverse to return to tap position 2.

==== Solid-state tap changer ====
This is a relatively recent development which uses thyristors both to switch the transformer winding taps and to pass the load current in the steady state. The disadvantage is that all non-conducting thyristors connected to the unselected taps still dissipate power due to their leakage currents and they have limited short circuit tolerance. This power consumption can add up to a few kilowatts which appears as heat and causes a reduction in overall efficiency of the transformer; however, it results in a more compact design that reduces the size and weight of the tap changer device. Solid state tap changers are typically employed only on smaller power transformers.

== Voltage considerations ==
If only one tap changer is required, manually operated tap points are usually made on the high voltage (primary) or lower current winding of the transformer to minimize the current handling requirements of the contacts. However, a transformer may include a tap changer on each winding if there are advantages to do so. For example, in power distribution networks, a large step-down transformer may have an off-load tap changer on the primary winding and an on load automatic tap changer on the secondary winding or windings. The high voltage tap is set to match long term system profile on the high voltage network (typically supply voltage averages) and is rarely changed. The low voltage tap may be requested to change positions multiple times each day, without interrupting the power delivery, to follow loading conditions on the low-voltage (secondary winding) network.

To minimize the number of winding taps and thus reduce the physical size of a tap changing transformer, a 'reversing' tap changer winding may be used, which is a portion of the main winding able to be connected in its opposite direction (buck) and thus oppose the voltage.

== Standards considering tap changers ==
Name	Status
IEC 60214-1:2014	Current
IEC 60214-2:2004	Current
IEEE Std C57.131-2012	Current
ГОСТ 24126-80 (СТ СЭВ 634-77)	Current
IEC 214:1997	Replaced by a later version
IEC 214:1989	Replaced by a later version
IEC 214:1985	Replaced by a later version
